Apocynaceae (from Apocynum, Greek for "dog-away") is a family of flowering plants in the order Gentianales that includes trees, shrubs, herbs, stem succulents, and vines, commonly known as the dogbane family, because some taxa were used as dog poison.  Members of the family are native to the European, Asian, African, Australian, and American tropics or subtropics, with some temperate members. The former family Asclepiadaceae (now known as Asclepiadoideae) is considered a subfamily of Apocynaceae and contains 348 genera. A list of Apocynaceae genera may be found here.

23,420 species of vascular plant have been recorded in South Africa, making it the sixth most species-rich country in the world and the most species-rich country on the African continent. Of these, 153 species are considered to be threatened. Nine biomes have been described in South Africa: Fynbos, Succulent Karoo, desert, Nama Karoo, grassland, savanna, Albany thickets, the Indian Ocean coastal belt, and forests.

The 2018 South African National Biodiversity Institute's National Biodiversity Assessment plant checklist lists 35,130 taxa in the phyla Anthocerotophyta (hornworts (6)), Anthophyta (flowering plants (33534)), Bryophyta (mosses (685)), Cycadophyta (cycads (42)), Lycopodiophyta (Lycophytes(45)), Marchantiophyta (liverworts (376)), Pinophyta (conifers (33)), and Pteridophyta (cryptogams (408)).

111 genera are represented in the literature. Listed taxa include species, subspecies, varieties, and forms as recorded, some of which have subsequently been allocated to other taxa as synonyms, in which cases the accepted taxon is appended to the listing. Multiple entries under alternative names reflect taxonomic revision over time.

Acokanthera 
Genus Acokanthera:
 Acokanthera oblongifolia (Hochst.) Codd, indigenous
 Acokanthera oppositifolia (Lam.) Codd, indigenous
 Acokanthera rotundata (Codd) Kupicha, indigenous

Adenium 
Genus Adenium:
 Adenium multiflorum Klotzsch, indigenous
 Adenium oleifolium Stapf, indigenous
 Adenium swazicum Stapf, indigenous

Ancylobothrys 
Genus Ancylobothrys:
 Ancylobothrys capensis (Oliv.) Pichon, indigenous
 Ancylobothrys petersiana (Klotzsch) Pierre, indigenous

Anisotoma 
Genus Anisotoma:
 Anisotoma cordifolia Fenzl, endemic
 Anisotoma pedunculata N.E.Br. indigenous

Araujia 
Genus Araujia:
 Araujia sericifera Brot. not indigenous, naturalised, invasive

Arduina 
Genus Arduina:
 Arduina acuminata E.Mey. accepted as Carissa bispinosa (L.) Desf. ex Brenan, indigenous
 Arduina bispinosa L. accepted as Carissa bispinosa (L.) Desf. ex Brenan, indigenous
 Arduina edulis (Vahl) Spreng. accepted as Carissa spinarum L. indigenous
 Arduina erythrocarpa Eckl. accepted as Carissa bispinosa (L.) Desf. ex Brenan, indigenous
 Arduina ferox E.Mey. accepted as Carissa bispinosa (L.) Desf. ex Brenan, indigenous
 Arduina grandiflora E.Mey. accepted as Carissa macrocarpa (Eckl.) A.DC. indigenous
 Arduina haematocarpa Eckl. accepted as Carissa bispinosa (L.) Desf. ex Brenan, indigenous
 Arduina macrocarpa Eckl. accepted as Carissa macrocarpa (Eckl.) A.DC. indigenous
 Arduina megaphylla Gand. accepted as Carissa bispinosa (L.) Desf. ex Brenan, indigenous
 Arduina tetramera Sacleux, accepted as Carissa tetramera (Sacleux) Stapf, indigenous

Asclepias 
Genus Asclepias:
 Asclepias adscendens (Schltr.) Schltr. indigenous
 Asclepias affinis (Schltr.) Schltr. accepted as Asclepias albens (E.Mey.) Schltr. present
 Asclepias albens (E.Mey.) Schltr. indigenous
 Asclepias aurea (Schltr.) Schltr. indigenous
 Asclepias bicuspis N.E.Br. endemic
 Asclepias brevicuspis (E.Mey.) Schltr. endemic
 Asclepias brevipes (Schltr.) Schltr. endemic
 Asclepias buchenaviana Schinz, accepted as Gomphocarpus filiformis (E.Mey.) D.Dietr. present
 Asclepias burchellii Schltr. accepted as Gomphocarpus tomentosus Burch. subsp. tomentosus,   present
 Asclepias cancellata Burm.f. accepted as Gomphocarpus cancellatus (Burm.f.) Bruyns, present
 Asclepias cognata N.E.Br. accepted as Aspidonepsis cognata (N.E.Br.) Nicholas & Goyder, indigenous
 Asclepias compressidens (N.E.Br.) Nicholas, endemic
 Asclepias concinna (Schltr.) Schltr. endemic
 Asclepias cooperi N.E.Br. endemic
 Asclepias crassinervis N.E.Br. indigenous
 Asclepias crinita (G.Bertol.) N.E.Br. accepted as Gomphocarpus fruticosus (L.) Aiton f. subsp. fruticosus 
 Asclepias crispa P.J.Bergius, indigenous
 Asclepias crispa P.J.Bergius var. crispa, endemic
 Asclepias crispa P.J.Bergius var. plana N.E.Br. endemic
 Asclepias crispa P.J.Bergius var. pseudocrispa N.E.Br. endemic
 Asclepias cucullata (Schltr.) Schltr. indigenous
 Asclepias cucullata (Schltr.) Schltr. subsp. cucullata,   indigenous
 Asclepias cultriformis (Harv. ex Schltr.) Schltr. indigenous
 Asclepias curassavica L. not indigenous, naturalised
 Asclepias decipiens N.E.Br. accepted as Gomphocarpus fruticosus (L.) Aiton f. subsp. decipiens (N.E.Br.) Goyder & Nicholas, present
 Asclepias densiflora N.E.Br. indigenous
 Asclepias depressa (Schltr.) Schltr. accepted as Asclepias multicaulis (E.Mey.) Schltr. present
 Asclepias diploglossa (Turcz.) Druce, accepted as Aspidonepsis diploglossa (Turcz.) Nicholas & Goyder, indigenous
 Asclepias disparilis N.E.Br. endemic
 Asclepias dissona N.E.Br. endemic
 Asclepias dregeana Schltr. var. calceolus (S.Moore) N.E.Br. accepted as Asclepias fulva N.E.Br. indigenous
 Asclepias dregeana Schltr. var. sordida N.E.Br. accepted as Asclepias fulva N.E.Br. present
 Asclepias eminens (Harv.) Schltr. indigenous
 Asclepias expansa (E.Mey.) Schltr. endemic
 Asclepias fallax (Schltr.) Schltr. endemic
 Asclepias filiformis (E.Mey.) Benth. & Hook. ex Kuntze, accepted as Gomphocarpus filiformis (E.Mey.) D.Dietr. indigenous
 Asclepias flava N.E.Br. accepted as Aspidonepsis flava (N.E.Br.) Nicholas & Goyder, indigenous
 Asclepias flexuosa (E.Mey.) Schltr. endemic
 Asclepias fruticosa L. accepted as Gomphocarpus fruticosus (L.) Aiton f. subsp. fruticosus,   present
 Asclepias fulva N.E.Br. indigenous
 Asclepias gibba (E.Mey.) Schltr. indigenous
 Asclepias gibba (E.Mey.) Schltr. var. gibba,   indigenous
 Asclepias gibba (E.Mey.) Schltr. var. media N.E.Br. indigenous
 Asclepias glaucophylla (Schltr.) Schltr. accepted as Gomphocarpus glaucophyllus Schltr. present
 Asclepias gordon-grayae Nicholas, endemic
 Asclepias hastata (E.Mey.) Schltr. endemic
 Asclepias humilis (E.Mey.) Schltr. indigenous
 Asclepias macropus (Schltr.) Schltr. endemic
 Asclepias meliodora (Schltr.) Schltr. indigenous
 Asclepias meliodora (Schltr.) Schltr. var. brevicoronata N.E.Br. accepted as Asclepias meliodora (Schltr.) Schltr. present
 Asclepias meyeriana (Schltr.) Schltr. indigenous
 Asclepias montevaga M.Glen, Nicholas & Bester, indigenous
 Asclepias monticola N.E.Br. endemic
 Asclepias multicaulis (E.Mey.) Schltr. indigenous
 Asclepias multiflora (Decne.) N.E.Br. endemic
 Asclepias nana I.Verd. endemic
 Asclepias navicularis (E.Mey.) Schltr. endemic
 Asclepias oreophila Nicholas, indigenous
 Asclepias patens N.E.Br. endemic
 Asclepias peltigera (E.Mey.) Schltr. endemic
 Asclepias physocarpa (E.Mey.) Schltr. accepted as Gomphocarpus physocarpus E.Mey. present
 Asclepias praemorsa Schltr. endemic
 Asclepias pulchella (Decne.) N.E.Br. accepted as Asclepias ameliae S.Moore, present
 Asclepias rara N.E.Br. endemic
 Asclepias reenensis N.E.Br. accepted as Aspidonepsis reenensis (N.E.Br.) Nicholas & Goyder, indigenous
 Asclepias rivularis (Schltr.) Schltr. accepted as Gomphocarpus rivularis Schltr. present
 Asclepias rostrata N.E.Br. accepted as Gomphocarpus fruticosus (L.) Aiton f. subsp. rostratus (N.E.Br.) Goyder & Nicholas 
 Asclepias sabulosa Schltr. accepted as Asclepias crispa P.J.Bergius var. crispa,   present
 Asclepias schizoglossoides Schltr. accepted as Aspidonepsis diploglossa (Turcz.) Nicholas & Goyder, indigenous
 Asclepias schlechteri (K.Schum.) N.E.Br. indigenous
 Asclepias schweinfurthii N.E.Br. accepted as Pachycarpus lineolatus (Decne.) Bullock 
 Asclepias stellifera Schltr. indigenous
 Asclepias ulophylla Schltr. endemic
 Asclepias velutina (Schltr.) Schltr. endemic
 Asclepias vicaria N.E.Br. endemic
 Asclepias viridiflora (E.Mey.) Goyder, accepted as Asclepias fulva N.E.Br. present
 Asclepias woodii (Schltr.) Schltr. endemic
 Asclepias xysmalobioides Hilliard & B.L.Burtt, accepted as Asclepias montevaga M.Glen, Nicholas & Bester, indigenous

Aspidoglossum 
Genus Aspidoglossum:
 Aspidoglossum albocoronatum Bester & Nicholas, endemic
 Aspidoglossum araneiferum (Schltr.) Kupicha, indigenous
 Aspidoglossum biflorum E.Mey. indigenous
 Aspidoglossum carinatum (Schltr.) Kupicha, indigenous
 Aspidoglossum delagoense (Schltr.) Kupicha, indigenous
 Aspidoglossum demissum Kupicha, endemic
 Aspidoglossum difficile Hilliard, endemic
 Aspidoglossum dissimile (N.E.Br.) Kupicha, endemic
 Aspidoglossum fasciculare E.Mey. indigenous
 Aspidoglossum flanaganii (Schltr.) Kupicha, endemic
 Aspidoglossum glabrescens (Schltr.) Kupicha, endemic
 Aspidoglossum glanduliferum (Schltr.) Kupicha, endemic
 Aspidoglossum gracile (E.Mey.) Kupicha, endemic
 Aspidoglossum grandiflorum (Schltr.) Kupicha, endemic
 Aspidoglossum heterophyllum E.Mey. endemic
 Aspidoglossum interruptum (E.Mey.) Bullock, indigenous
 Aspidoglossum lamellatum (Schltr.) Kupicha, indigenous
 Aspidoglossum ovalifolium (Schltr.) Kupicha, indigenous
 Aspidoglossum restioides (Schltr.) Kupicha, endemic
 Aspidoglossum uncinatum (N.E.Br.) Kupicha, endemic
 Aspidoglossum validum Kupicha, indigenous
 Aspidoglossum virgatum (E.Mey.) Kupicha, endemic
 Aspidoglossum woodii (Schltr.) Kupicha, endemic
 Aspidoglossum xanthosphaerum Hilliard, endemic

Aspidonepsis 
Genus Aspidonepsis:
 Aspidonepsis cognata (N.E.Br.) Nicholas & Goyder, endemic
 Aspidonepsis diploglossa (Turcz.) Nicholas & Goyder, indigenous
 Aspidonepsis flava (N.E.Br.) Nicholas & Goyder, endemic
 Aspidonepsis reenensis (N.E.Br.) Nicholas & Goyder, indigenous
 Aspidonepsis shebae Nicholas & Goyder, endemic

Astephanus 
Genus Astephanus:
 Astephanus marginatus Decne. accepted as Astephanus zeyheri Turcz. present
 Astephanus triflorus (L.f.) Schult. endemic
 Astephanus zeyheri Turcz. endemic

Australluma 
Genus Australluma:
 Australluma ubomboensis (I.Verd.) Bruyns, indigenous

Brachystelma 
Genus Brachystelma:
 Brachystelma angustum Peckover, endemic
 Brachystelma arnotii Baker, indigenous
 Brachystelma australe R.A.Dyer, endemic
 Brachystelma barberae Harv. ex Hook.f. indigenous
 Brachystelma brevipedicellatum Turrill, endemic
 Brachystelma bruceae]] R.A.Dyer, indigenous
 Brachystelma bruceae R.A.Dyer subsp. bruceae,   endemic
 Brachystelma bruceae R.A.Dyer subsp. hirsutum R.A.Dyer, endemic
 Brachystelma burchellii (Decne.) Peckover, indigenous
 Brachystelma burchellii (Decne.) Peckover var. burchellii,   indigenous
 Brachystelma burchellii (Decne.) Peckover var. grandiflorum (N.E.Br.) Meve, indigenous
 Brachystelma caffrum (Schltr.) N.E.Br. endemic
 Brachystelma campanulatum N.E.Br. endemic
 Brachystelma canum R.A.Dyer, endemic
 Brachystelma cathcartense R.A.Dyer, endemic
 Brachystelma chloranthum (Schltr.) Peckover, indigenous
 Brachystelma chlorozonum E.A.Bruce, endemic
 Brachystelma christianeae Peckover, endemic
 Brachystelma circinatum E.Mey. indigenous
 Brachystelma coddii R.A.Dyer, indigenous
 Brachystelma comptum N.E.Br. endemic
 Brachystelma cummingii A.P.Dold, indigenous
 Brachystelma cupulatum R.A.Dyer, indigenous
 Brachystelma decipiens N.E.Br. endemic
 Brachystelma delicatum R.A.Dyer, endemic
 Brachystelma dimorphum R.A.Dyer, indigenous
 Brachystelma dimorphum R.A.Dyer subsp. dimorphum, endemic
 Brachystelma dimorphum R.A.Dyer subsp. gratum R.A.Dyer, endemic
 Brachystelma discoideum R.A.Dyer, indigenous
 Brachystelma duplicatum R.A.Dyer, endemic
 Brachystelma dyeri K.Balkwill & M.Balkwill, endemic
 Brachystelma elongatum (Schltr.) N.E.Br. endemic
 Brachystelma filifolium (N.E.Br.) Peckover, indigenous
 Brachystelma foetidum Schltr. indigenous
 Brachystelma franksiae N.E.Br. indigenous
 Brachystelma franksiae N.E.Br. subsp. franksiae, endemic
 Brachystelma franksiae N.E.Br. subsp. grandiflorum A.P.Dold & Bruyns, endemic
 Brachystelma gemmeum R.A.Dyer, endemic
 Brachystelma gerrardii Harv. indigenous
 Brachystelma glenense R.A.Dyer, endemic
 Brachystelma gracile E.A.Bruce, indigenous
 Brachystelma gracillimum R.A.Dyer, endemic
 Brachystelma gymnopodum (Schltr.) Bruyns, indigenous
 Brachystelma hirtellum Weim. indigenous
 Brachystelma huttonii (Harv.) N.E.Br. endemic
 Brachystelma incanum R.A.Dyer, indigenous
 Brachystelma inconspicuum S.Venter, endemic
 Brachystelma kerzneri Peckover, endemic
 Brachystelma longifolium (Schltr.) N.E.Br. endemic
 Brachystelma luteum Peckover, endemic
 Brachystelma macropetalum (Schltr.) N.E.Br. indigenous
 Brachystelma meyerianum Schltr. endemic
 Brachystelma micranthum E.Mey. endemic
 Brachystelma minimum R.A.Dyer, endemic
 Brachystelma minor E.A.Bruce, endemic
 Brachystelma modestum R.A.Dyer, endemic
 Brachystelma molaventi Peckover & A.E.van Wyk, endemic
 Brachystelma montanum R.A.Dyer, endemic
 Brachystelma nanum (Schltr.) N.E.Br. endemic
 Brachystelma natalense (Schltr.) N.E.Br. endemic
 Brachystelma ngomense R.A.Dyer, endemic
 Brachystelma occidentale Schltr. endemic
 Brachystelma oianthum Schltr. endemic
 Brachystelma pachypodium R.A.Dyer, endemic
 Brachystelma parvulum R.A.Dyer, endemic
 Brachystelma perditum R.A.Dyer, indigenous
 Brachystelma petraeum R.A.Dyer, endemic
 Brachystelma pilosum R.A.Dyer, accepted as Brachystelma hirtellum Weim. present
 Brachystelma praelongum S.Moore, indigenous
 Brachystelma pulchellum (Harv.) Schltr. endemic
 Brachystelma pygmaeum (Schltr.) N.E.Br. indigenous
 Brachystelma pygmaeum (Schltr.) N.E.Br. subsp. flavidum (Schltr.) R.A.Dyer, endemic
 Brachystelma pygmaeum (Schltr.) N.E.Br. subsp. pygmaeum, endemic
 Brachystelma ramosissimum (Schltr.) N.E.Br. indigenous
 Brachystelma remotum R.A.Dyer, endemic
 Brachystelma rubellum (E.Mey.) Peckover, indigenous
 Brachystelma sandersonii (Oliv.) N.E.Br. endemic
 Brachystelma schizoglossoides (Schltr.) N.E.Br. endemic
 Brachystelma schoenlandianum Schltr. endemic
 Brachystelma setosum Peckover, endemic
 Brachystelma stellatum E.A.Bruce & R.A.Dyer, indigenous
 Brachystelma stenophyllum (Schltr.) R.A.Dyer, indigenous
 Brachystelma swazicum R.A.Dyer, indigenous
 Brachystelma tabularium R.A.Dyer, endemic
 Brachystelma tenellum R.A.Dyer, endemic
 Brachystelma tenue R.A.Dyer, endemic
 Brachystelma theronii Bruyns, indigenous
 Brachystelma thunbergii N.E.Br. endemic
 Brachystelma tuberosum (Meerb.) R.Br. ex Sims, indigenous
 Brachystelma vahrmeijeri R.A.Dyer, endemic
 Brachystelma villosum (Schltr.) N.E.Br. indigenous
 Brachystelma waterbergensis Peckover, endemic

Callichilia 
Genus Callichilia:
 Callichilia orientalis S.Moore, indigenous

Calotropis 
Genus Calotropis:
 Calotropis busseana K.Schum. accepted as Pachycarpus lineolatus (Decne.) Bullock 
 Calotropis procera (Aiton) W.T.Aiton, not indigenous, naturalised, invasive

Caralluma 
Genus Caralluma:
 Caralluma arida (Masson) N.E.Br. accepted as Quaqua arida (N.E.Br.) Plowes, present
 Caralluma chlorantha Schltr. endemic
 Caralluma intermedia (N.E.Br.) Schltr. endemic
 Caralluma maughani R.A.Dyer, accepted as Pectinaria maughanii (R.A.Dyer) Bruyns, present
 Caralluma nebrownii A.Berger, accepted as Orbea lutea (N.E.Br.) Bruyns subsp. vaga (N.E.Br.) Bruyns 
 Caralluma peschii Nel, accepted as Australluma peschii (Nel) Plowes

Carandas 
Genus Carandas:
 Carandas arduina (Lam.) S.Moore, accepted as Carissa bispinosa (L.) Desf. ex Brenan, indigenous
 Carandas edulis (Vahl) Hiern, accepted as Carissa spinarum L. indigenous

Carissa 
Genus Carissa:
 Carissa acuminata (E.Mey.) A.DC. accepted as Carissa bispinosa (L.) Desf. ex Brenan, indigenous
 Carissa arduina Lam. accepted as Carissa bispinosa (L.) Desf. ex Brenan, indigenous
 Carissa bispinosa (L.) Desf. ex Brenan, indigenous
 Carissa bispinosa (L.) Desf. ex Brenan subsp. zambesiensis Kupicha, accepted as Carissa bispinosa (L.) Desf. ex Brenan, indigenous
 Carissa bispinosa (L.) Desf. ex Brenan var. acuminata (E.Mey.) Codd, accepted as Carissa bispinosa (L.) Desf. ex Brenan, indigenous
 Carissa cordata (Mill.) Fourc. accepted as Carissa bispinosa (L.) Desf. ex Brenan 
 Carissa edulis Vahl, accepted as Carissa spinarum L. indigenous
 Carissa edulis Vahl subsp. continentalis Pichon, accepted as Carissa spinarum L. indigenous
 Carissa erythrocarpa (Eckl.) A.DC. accepted as Carissa bispinosa (L.) Desf. ex Brenan, indigenous
 Carissa ferox (E.Mey.) A.DC. accepted as Carissa bispinosa (L.) Desf. ex Brenan, indigenous
 Carissa grandiflora (E.Mey.) A.DC. accepted as Carissa macrocarpa (Eckl.) A.DC. indigenous
 Carissa haematocarpa (Eckl.) A.DC. accepted as Carissa bispinosa (L.) Desf. ex Brenan, indigenous
 Carissa macrocarpa (Eckl.) A.DC. indigenous
 Carissa spinarum L. indigenous
 Carissa tetramera (Sacleux) Stapf, indigenous
 Carissa wyliei N.E.Br. accepted as Carissa bispinosa (L.) Desf. ex Brenan, indigenous

Cascabela 
Genus Cascabela:
 Cascabela thevetia (L.) Lippold, not indigenous, cultivated, naturalised, invasive

Catharanthus 
Genus Catharanthus:
 Catharanthus roseus (L.) G.Don, not indigenous, naturalised, invasive

Ceropegia 
Genus Ceropegia:
 Ceropegia africana R.Br. indigenous
 Ceropegia africana R.Br. subsp. africana, endemic
 Ceropegia africana R.Br. subsp. barklyi Bruyns, indigenous
 Ceropegia ampliata E.Mey. indigenous
 Ceropegia ampliata E.Mey. var. ampliata, indigenous
 Ceropegia antennifera Schltr. endemic
 Ceropegia apiculata Schltr. accepted as Ceropegia lugardae N.E.Br. 
 Ceropegia arenaria R.A.Dyer, endemic
 Ceropegia barbata R.A.Dyer, endemic
 Ceropegia barbertonensis N.E.Br. accepted as Ceropegia linearis E.Mey. subsp. woodii (Schltr.) H.Huber 
 Ceropegia barklyi Hook.f. accepted as Ceropegia africana R.Br. subsp. barklyi Bruyns, present
 Ceropegia bowkeri Harv. indigenous
 Ceropegia bowkeri Harv. subsp. bowkeri, endemic
 Ceropegia bowkeri Harv. subsp. sororia (Harv. ex Hook.f.) R.A.Dyer, endemic
 Ceropegia cancellata Rchb. endemic
 Ceropegia carnosa E.Mey. indigenous
 Ceropegia cimiciodora Oberm. indigenous
 Ceropegia connivens R.A.Dyer, accepted as Ceropegia fimbriata E.Mey. subsp. connivens (R.A.Dyer) Bruyns, present
 Ceropegia connivens R.A.Dyer forma angustata R.A.Dyer, accepted as Ceropegia fimbriata E.Mey. subsp. connivens (R.A.Dyer) Bruyns, present
 Ceropegia conrathii Schltr. endemic
 Ceropegia craibii J.Victor, endemic
 Ceropegia crassifolia Schltr. indigenous
 Ceropegia crassifolia Schltr. var. crassifolia, indigenous
 Ceropegia cycniflora R.A.Dyer, endemic
 Ceropegia decidua E.A.Bruce, indigenous
 Ceropegia decidua E.A.Bruce subsp. decidua, indigenous
 Ceropegia decidua E.A.Bruce subsp. pretoriensis R.A.Dyer, endemic
 Ceropegia distincta N.E.Br. indigenous
 Ceropegia distincta N.E.Br. subsp. haygarthii (Schltr.) H.Huber, accepted as Ceropegia haygarthii Schltr. present
 Ceropegia distincta N.E.Br. subsp. lugardae (N.E.Br.) H.Huber, accepted as Ceropegia lugardae N.E.Br. 
 Ceropegia distincta N.E.Br. subsp. verruculosa R.A.Dyer, endemic
 Ceropegia dubia R.A.Dyer, endemic
 Ceropegia filiformis (Burch.) Schltr. indigenous
 Ceropegia fimbriata E.Mey. indigenous
 Ceropegia fimbriata E.Mey. subsp. connivens (R.A.Dyer) Bruyns, endemic
 Ceropegia fimbriata E.Mey. subsp. fimbriata,   indigenous
 Ceropegia fimbriata E.Mey. subsp. geniculata (R.A.Dyer) Bruyns, endemic
 Ceropegia fortuita R.A.Dyer, indigenous
 Ceropegia geniculata R.A.Dyer, accepted as Ceropegia fimbriata E.Mey. subsp. geniculata (R.A.Dyer) Bruyns, present
 Ceropegia hastata N.E.Br. accepted as Ceropegia linearis E.Mey. subsp. woodii (Schltr.) H.Huber 
 Ceropegia haygarthii Schltr. endemic
 Ceropegia insignis R.A.Dyer, endemic
 Ceropegia leptophylla Bruyns, indigenous
 Ceropegia linearis E.Mey. indigenous
 Ceropegia linearis E.Mey. subsp. linearis,   indigenous
 Ceropegia linearis E.Mey. subsp. tenuis (N.E.Br.) Bruyns, endemic
 Ceropegia linearis E.Mey. subsp. woodii (Schltr.) H.Huber, indigenous
 Ceropegia macmasteri A.P.Dold, indigenous
 Ceropegia mafekingensis (N.E.Br.) R.A.Dyer, indigenous
 Ceropegia meyeri Decne. indigenous
 Ceropegia multiflora Baker, indigenous
 Ceropegia multiflora Baker subsp. multiflora,   indigenous
 Ceropegia multiflora Baker subsp. tentaculata (N.E.Br.) H.Huber, indigenous
 Ceropegia namaquensis Bruyns, endemic
 Ceropegia nilotica Kotschy, indigenous
 Ceropegia nilotica Kotschy var. nilotica,   indigenous
 Ceropegia occidentalis R.A.Dyer, indigenous
 Ceropegia occulta R.A.Dyer, endemic
 Ceropegia pachystelma Schltr. indigenous
 Ceropegia pachystelma Schltr. subsp. pachystelma,   indigenous
 Ceropegia pumila N.E.Br. accepted as Brachystelma gymnopodum (Schltr.) Bruyns 
 Ceropegia pygmaea Schinz, accepted as Brachystelma gymnopodum (Schltr.) Bruyns, present
 Ceropegia racemosa N.E.Br. subsp. setifera (Schltr.) H.Huber, accepted as Ceropegia carnosa E.Mey. present
 Ceropegia radicans Schltr. indigenous
 Ceropegia radicans Schltr. subsp. radicans,   endemic
 Ceropegia radicans Schltr. subsp. smithii (M.R.Hend.) R.A.Dyer, indigenous
 Ceropegia rendallii N.E.Br. indigenous
 Ceropegia rudatisii Schltr. endemic
 Ceropegia sandersonii Decne. ex Hook. indigenous
 Ceropegia scabriflora N.E.Br. endemic
 Ceropegia schoenlandii N.E.Br. accepted as Ceropegia linearis E.Mey. subsp. woodii (Schltr.) H.Huber 
 Ceropegia stapeliiformis Haw. indigenous
 Ceropegia stapeliiformis Haw. subsp. serpentina (E.A.Bruce) R.A.Dyer, indigenous
 Ceropegia stapeliiformis Haw. subsp. stapeliiformis,   endemic
 Ceropegia stenantha K.Schum. indigenous
 Ceropegia stentiae E.A.Bruce, endemic
 Ceropegia tenuis N.E.Br. accepted as Ceropegia linearis E.Mey. subsp. tenuis (N.E.Br.) Bruyns, present
 Ceropegia tomentosa Schltr. endemic
 Ceropegia turricula E.A.Bruce, endemic
 Ceropegia woodii Schltr. accepted as Ceropegia linearis E.Mey. subsp. woodii (Schltr.) H.Huber, present
 Ceropegia zeyheri Schltr. endemic

Chlorocyathus 
Genus Chlorocyathus:
 Chlorocyathus lobulata (Venter & R.L.Verh.) Venter, endemic
 Chlorocyathus monteiroae Oliv. indigenous

Cordylogyne 
Genus Cordylogyne:
 Cordylogyne globosa E.Mey. indigenous

Cryptolepis 
Genus Cryptolepis:
 Cryptolepis capensis Schltr. indigenous
 Cryptolepis cryptolepioides (Schltr.) Bullock, indigenous
 Cryptolepis decidua (Planch. ex Benth.) N.E.Br. indigenous
 Cryptolepis delagoensis Schltr. indigenous
 Cryptolepis oblongifolia (Meisn.) Schltr. indigenous
 Cryptolepis obtusa N.E.Br. indigenous
 Cryptolepis transvaalensis Schltr. accepted as Cryptolepis cryptolepioides (Schltr.) Bullock, present

Cryptostegia 
Genus Cryptostegia:
 Cryptostegia grandiflora R.Br. not indigenous, naturalised, invasive
 Cryptostegia madagascariensis Bojer, not indigenous, naturalised, invasive

Curroria 
Genus Curroria:
 Curroria decidua Planch. ex Benth. subsp. decidua,   accepted as Cryptolepis decidua (Planch. ex Benth.) N.E.Br. present

Cynanchum 
Genus Cynanchum:
 Cynanchum africanum (L.) Hoffmanns. endemic
 Cynanchum africanum R.Br. var. crassifolium N.E.Br. accepted as Cynanchum africanum (L.) Hoffmanns. present
 Cynanchum capense Thunb. accepted as Pentatropis capensis (L.f.) Bullock, present
 Cynanchum ellipticum (Harv.) R.A.Dyer, indigenous
 Cynanchum gerrardii (Harv.) Liede, indigenous
 Cynanchum hastatum Pers. accepted as Leptadenia hastata (Pers.) Decne. 
 Cynanchum intermedium N.E.Br. accepted as Cynanchum africanum (L.) Hoffmanns. present
 Cynanchum meyeri (Decne.) Schltr. indigenous
 Cynanchum mossambicense K.Schum. indigenous
 Cynanchum natalitium Schltr. endemic
 Cynanchum obtusifolium L.f. indigenous
 Cynanchum obtusifolium L.f. var. pilosum Schltr. accepted as Cynanchum obtusifolium L.f. present
 Cynanchum orangeanum (Schltr.) N.E.Br. indigenous
 Cynanchum pearsonianum Liede & Meve, indigenous
 Cynanchum schistoglossum Schltr. indigenous
 Cynanchum validum N.E.Br. accepted as Schizostephanus alatus Hochst. ex K.Schum. indigenous
 Cynanchum viminale (L.) Bassi, indigenous
 Cynanchum viminale (L.) Bassi subsp. orangeanum (Liede & Meve) Liede & Meve, endemic
 Cynanchum viminale (L.) Bassi subsp. suberosum (Meve & Liede) Goyder, indigenous
 Cynanchum viminale (L.) Bassi subsp. thunbergii (G.Don) Liede & Meve, indigenous
 Cynanchum viminale (L.) Bassi subsp. viminale,   indigenous
 Cynanchum virens (E.Mey.) D.Dietr. indigenous
 Cynanchum zeyheri Schltr. endemic

Daemia 
Genus Daemia:
 Daemia barbata Schltr. accepted as Pergularia daemia (Forssk.) Chiov. subsp. daemia

Dichaelia 
Genus Dichaelia:
 Dichaelia breviflora Schltr. subsp. pygmaea Schltr. accepted as Brachystelma pygmaeum (Schltr.) N.E.Br. subsp. pygmaeum

Diplorhynchus 
Genus Diplorhynchus:
 Diplorhynchus condylocarpon (Mull.Arg.) Pichon, indigenous

Dregea 
Genus Dregea:
 Dregea floribunda E.Mey. accepted as Marsdenia dregea (Harv.) Schltr. present
 Dregea macrantha Klotzsch, accepted as Marsdenia macrantha (Klotzsch) Schltr. present

Duvalia 
Genus Duvalia:
 Duvalia angustiloba N.E.Br. endemic
 Duvalia caespitosa (Masson) Haw. indigenous
 Duvalia caespitosa (Masson) Haw. subsp. caespitosa, indigenous
 Duvalia caespitosa (Masson) Haw. subsp. pubescens (N.E.Br.) Bruyns, indigenous
 Duvalia caespitosa (Masson) Haw. subsp. vestita (Meve) Bruyns, endemic
 Duvalia caespitosa (Masson) Haw. var. compacta (Haw.) Meve, accepted as Duvalia caespitosa (Masson) Haw. subsp. caespitosa, endemic
 Duvalia compacta Haw. accepted as Duvalia caespitosa (Masson) Haw. subsp. caespitosa,   present
 Duvalia corderoyi (Hook.f.) N.E.Br. endemic
 Duvalia elegans (Masson) Haw. endemic
 Duvalia elegans (Masson) Haw. var. namaquana N.E.Br. accepted as Duvalia caespitosa (Masson) Haw. subsp. pubescens (N.E.Br.) Bruyns, present
 Duvalia elegans (Masson) Haw. var. seminuda N.E.Br. accepted as Duvalia elegans (Masson) Haw. present
 Duvalia emiliana A.C.White, accepted as Duvalia caespitosa (Masson) Haw. subsp. caespitosa,   present
 Duvalia gracilis Meve, accepted as Duvalia modesta N.E.Br. endemic
 Duvalia immaculata (C.A.Luckh.) Bayer ex L.C.Leach, endemic
 Duvalia maculata N.E.Br. indigenous
 Duvalia modesta N.E.Br. endemic
 Duvalia parviflora N.E.Br. endemic
 Duvalia pillansii N.E.Br. endemic
 Duvalia pillansii N.E.Br. var. albanica N.E.Br. accepted as Duvalia pillansii N.E.Br. present
 Duvalia polita N.E.Br. indigenous
 Duvalia polita N.E.Br. var. parviflora (L.Bolus) A.C.White & B.Sloane, accepted as Duvalia polita N.E.Br. present
 Duvalia polita N.E.Br. var. transvaalensis (Schltr.) A.C.White & B.Sloane, accepted as Duvalia polita N.E.Br. present
 Duvalia procumbens R.A.Dyer, accepted as Huernia procumbens (R.A.Dyer) L.C.Leach, present
 Duvalia pubescens N.E.Br. accepted as Duvalia caespitosa (Masson) Haw. subsp. pubescens (N.E.Br.) Bruyns, present
 Duvalia pubescens N.E.Br. var. major N.E.Br. accepted as Duvalia caespitosa (Masson) Haw. subsp. pubescens (N.E.Br.) Bruyns, present
 Duvalia radiata (Sims) Haw. accepted as Duvalia caespitosa (Masson) Haw. subsp. caespitosa, present
 Duvalia radiata (Sims) Haw. var. hirtella (Jacq.) A.C.White & B.Sloane, accepted as Duvalia caespitosa (Masson) Haw. subsp. caespitosa, present
 Duvalia radiata (Sims) Haw. var. minor (N.E.Br.) A.C.White & B.Sloane, accepted as Duvalia caespitosa (Masson) Haw. subsp. caespitosa, present
 Duvalia radiata (Sims) Haw. var. obscura (N.E.Br.) A.C.White & B.Sloane, accepted as Duvalia caespitosa (Masson) Haw. subsp. caespitosa, present
 Duvalia reclinata (Masson) Haw. accepted as Duvalia caespitosa (Masson) Haw. subsp. caespitosa, present
 Duvalia reclinata (Masson) Haw. var. angulata N.E.Br. accepted as Duvalia caespitosa (Masson) Haw. subsp. caespitosa, present
 Duvalia reclinata (Masson) Haw. var. bifida N.E.Br. accepted as Duvalia caespitosa (Masson) Haw. subsp. caespitosa, present
 Duvalia vestita Meve, accepted as Duvalia caespitosa (Masson) Haw. subsp. vestita (Meve) Bruyns, endemic

Echites 
Genus Echites:
 Echites succulentus L.f. accepted as Pachypodium succulentum (L.f.) Sweet, indigenous
 Echites tuberosus Haw. ex Steud. accepted as Pachypodium succulentum (L.f.) Sweet, indigenous

Ectadiopsis 
Genus Ectadiopsis:
 Ectadiopsis acutifolia (Sond.) Benth. accepted as Cryptolepis oblongifolia (Meisn.) Schltr. 
 Ectadiopsis oblongifolia (Meisn.) Benth. accepted as Cryptolepis oblongifolia (Meisn.) Schltr. present

Ectadium 
Genus Ectadium:
 Ectadium virgatum E.Mey. indigenous

Emplectanthus 
Genus Emplectanthus:
 Emplectanthus cordatus N.E.Br. endemic
 Emplectanthus dalzellii D.G.A.Styles, endemic
 Emplectanthus gerrardii N.E.Br. endemic

Ephippiocarpa 
Genus Ephippiocarpa:
 Ephippiocarpa orientalis (S.Moore) Markgr. accepted as Callichilia orientalis S.Moore, present

Eustegia 
Genus Eustegia:
 Eustegia filiformis (L.f.) Schult. endemic
 Eustegia fraterna N.E.Br. indigenous
 Eustegia fraterna N.E.Br. var. fraterna,   endemic
 Eustegia fraterna N.E.Br. var. pubescens N.E.Br. endemic
 Eustegia macropetala Schltr. endemic
 Eustegia minuta (L.f.) R.Br. endemic
 Eustegia plicata Schinz, endemic

Fanninia 
Genus Fanninia:
 Fanninia caloglossa Harv. endemic

Fockea 
Genus Fockea:
 Fockea angustifolia K.Schum. indigenous
 Fockea capensis Endl. endemic
 Fockea comaru (E.Mey.) N.E.Br. indigenous
 Fockea crispa (Jacq.) K.Schum. accepted as Fockea capensis Endl. present
 Fockea cylindrica R.A.Dyer, accepted as Fockea edulis (Thunb.) K.Schum. present
 Fockea edulis (Thunb.) K.Schum. indigenous
 Fockea gracilis R.A.Dyer, accepted as Fockea comaru (E.Mey.) N.E.Br. present
 Fockea sinuata (E.Mey.) Druce, indigenous
 Fockea tugelensis N.E.Br. accepted as Fockea angustifolia K.Schum. present

Gomphocarpus 
Genus Gomphocarpus:
 Gomphocarpus cancellatus (Burm.f.) Bruyns, indigenous
 Gomphocarpus diploglossus Turcz. accepted as Aspidonepsis diploglossa (Turcz.) Nicholas & Goyder, indigenous
 Gomphocarpus filiformis (E.Mey.) D.Dietr. indigenous
 Gomphocarpus fruticosus (L.) Aiton f. indigenous
 Gomphocarpus fruticosus (L.) Aiton f. subsp. decipiens (N.E.Br.) Goyder & Nicholas, indigenous
 Gomphocarpus fruticosus (L.) Aiton f. subsp. fruticosus,   indigenous
 Gomphocarpus glaucophyllus Schltr. indigenous
 Gomphocarpus physocarpus E.Mey. indigenous
 Gomphocarpus rivularis Schltr. indigenous
 Gomphocarpus tomentosus (Torr.) A.Gray, accepted as Asclepias californica Greene, present
 Gomphocarpus tomentosus Burch. indigenous
 Gomphocarpus tomentosus Burch. subsp. tomentosus,   indigenous

Gonioma 
Genus Gonioma:
 Gonioma kamassi E.Mey. indigenous

Gymnema 
Genus Gymnema:
 Gymnema sylvestre (Retz.) Schult. accepted as Marsdenia sylvestris (Retz.) P.I.Forst. present

Holarrhena 
Genus Holarrhena:
 Holarrhena pubescens (Buch.-Ham.) Wall. ex G.Don, indigenous

Hoodia 
Genus Hoodia:
 Hoodia albispina N.E.Br. accepted as Hoodia gordonii (Masson) Sweet ex Decne. present
 Hoodia alstonii (N.E.Br.) Plowes, indigenous
 Hoodia bainii Dyer, accepted as Hoodia gordonii (Masson) Sweet ex Decne. present
 Hoodia barklyi Dyer, accepted as Hoodia gordonii (Masson) Sweet ex Decne. present
 Hoodia burkei N.E.Br. accepted as Hoodia gordonii (Masson) Sweet ex Decne. present
 Hoodia currorii (Hook.) Decne. indigenous
 Hoodia currorii (Hook.) Decne. subsp. lugardii (N.E.Br.) Bruyns, indigenous
 Hoodia currorii (Hook.) Decne. var. currorii,   accepted as Hoodia currorii (Hook.) Decne. subsp. currorii 
 Hoodia currorii (Hook.) Decne. var. minor R.A.Dyer, accepted as Hoodia currorii (Hook.) Decne. subsp. currorii 
 Hoodia dinteri (A.Berger) Halda, accepted as Larryleachia marlothii (N.E.Br.) Plowes, indigenous
 Hoodia dregei N.E.Br. endemic
 Hoodia flava (N.E.Br.) Plowes, indigenous
 Hoodia gibbosa Nel, accepted as Hoodia currorii (Hook.) Decne. subsp. currorii 
 Hoodia gordonii (Masson) Sweet ex Decne. indigenous
 Hoodia husabensis Nel, accepted as Hoodia gordonii (Masson) Sweet ex Decne. 
 Hoodia langii Oberm. & Letty, accepted as Hoodia gordonii (Masson) Sweet ex Decne. present
 Hoodia lugardii N.E.Br. accepted as Hoodia currorii (Hook.) Decne. subsp. lugardii (N.E.Br.) Bruyns 
 Hoodia macrantha Dinter, accepted as Hoodia currorii (Hook.) Decne. subsp. currorii 
 Hoodia montana Nel, accepted as Hoodia currorii (Hook.) Decne. subsp. currorii 
 Hoodia officinalis (N.E.Br.) Plowes, indigenous
 Hoodia officinalis (N.E.Br.) Plowes subsp. officinalis,   indigenous
 Hoodia pilifera (L.f.) Plowes, indigenous
 Hoodia pilifera (L.f.) Plowes subsp. annulata (N.E.Br.) Bruyns, endemic
 Hoodia pilifera (L.f.) Plowes subsp. pilifera, endemic
 Hoodia pilifera (L.f.) Plowes subsp. pillansii (N.E.Br.) Bruyns, accepted as Hoodia grandis (N.E.Br.) Plowes, endemic
 Hoodia pillansii N.E.Br. accepted as Hoodia gordonii (Masson) Sweet ex Decne. present
 Hoodia rosea Oberm. & Letty, accepted as Hoodia gordonii (Masson) Sweet ex Decne. present
 Hoodia similis (N.E.Br.) Halda, accepted as Larryleachia cactiformis (Hook.) Plowes var. cactiformis,   indigenous
 Hoodia triebneri Schuldt, accepted as Hoodia triebneri (Nel) Bruyns 
 Hoodia whitesloaneana Dinter, accepted as Hoodia gordonii (Masson) Sweet ex Decne.

Huernia 
Genus Huernia:
 Huernia barbata (Masson) Haw. indigenous
 Huernia barbata (Masson) Haw. subsp. barbata,   indigenous
 Huernia barbata (Masson) Haw. subsp. ingeae (Lavranos) Bruyns, endemic
 Huernia barbata (Masson) Haw. var. griquensis N.E.Br. accepted as Huernia barbata (Masson) Haw. subsp. barbata,   present
 Huernia bayeri L.C.Leach, accepted as Huernia thuretii F.Cels, endemic
 Huernia blackbeardiae R.A.Dyer ex H.Jacobsen, accepted as Huernia zebrina N.E.Br. subsp. zebrina 
 Huernia blyderiverensis (L.C.Leach) Bruyns, endemic
 Huernia brevirostris N.E.Br. accepted as Huernia thuretii F.Cels, present
 Huernia brevirostris N.E.Br. subsp. baviaana L.C.Leach, accepted as Huernia thuretii F.Cels, endemic
 Huernia brevirostris N.E.Br. subsp. intermedia (N.E.Br.) L.C.Leach, accepted as Huernia thuretii F.Cels, endemic
 Huernia brevirostris N.E.Br. var. ecornuta (N.E.Br.) A.C.White & B.Sloane, accepted as Huernia thuretii F.Cels, endemic
 Huernia brevirostris N.E.Br. var. histrionica A.C.White & B.Sloane, accepted as Huernia thuretii F.Cels var. thuretii,   present
 Huernia brevirostris N.E.Br. var. immaculata (N.E.Br.) A.C.White & B.Sloane, accepted as Huernia thuretii F.Cels var. thuretii,   present
 Huernia brevirostris N.E.Br. var. intermedia N.E.Br. accepted as Huernia thuretii F.Cels var. thuretii,   indigenous
 Huernia brevirostris N.E.Br. var. longula (N.E.Br.) A.C.White & B.Sloane, accepted as Huernia thuretii F.Cels var. thuretii,   present
 Huernia brevirostris N.E.Br. var. pallida (N.E.Br.) A.C.White & B.Sloane, accepted as Huernia thuretii F.Cels var. thuretii, present
 Huernia brevirostris N.E.Br. var. parvipuncta A.C.White & B.Sloane, accepted as Huernia thuretii F.Cels var. thuretii, present
 Huernia brevirostris N.E.Br. var. scabra (N.E.Br.) A.C.White & B.Sloane, accepted as Huernia thuretii F.Cels var. thuretii, present
 Huernia campanulata (Masson) Haw. accepted as Huernia barbata (Masson) Haw. subsp. barbata, endemic
 Huernia campanulata (Masson) Haw. var. denticoronata N.E.Br. accepted as Huernia barbata (Masson) Haw. subsp. barbata, present
 Huernia clavigera (Jacq.) Haw. accepted as Huernia barbata (Masson) Haw. subsp. barbata, endemic
 Huernia clavigera (Jacq.) Haw. var. maritima N.E.Br. accepted as Huernia barbata (Masson) Haw. subsp. barbata,   present
 Huernia confusa E.Phillips, accepted as Huernia zebrina N.E.Br. subsp. insigniflora (C.A.Maass) Bruyns, indigenous
 Huernia decemdentata N.E.Br. accepted as Huernia barbata (Masson) Haw. subsp. barbata, present
 Huernia echidnopsioides (L.C.Leach) L.C.Leach, accepted as Huernia longii Pillans subsp. echidnopsioides (L.C.Leach) Bruyns, endemic
 Huernia guttata (Masson) Haw. indigenous
 Huernia guttata (Masson) Haw. subsp. calitzdorpensis L.C.Leach, accepted as Huernia guttata (Masson) Haw. subsp. guttata, endemic
 Huernia guttata (Masson) Haw. subsp. guttata, endemic
 Huernia guttata (Masson) Haw. subsp. reticulata (Masson) Bruyns, endemic
 Huernia humilis (Masson) Haw. endemic
 Huernia hystrix (Hook.f.) N.E.Br. indigenous
 Huernia hystrix (Hook.f.) N.E.Br. subsp. hystrix, indigenous
 Huernia hystrix (Hook.f.) N.E.Br. subsp. parvula (L.C.Leach) Bruyns, endemic
 Huernia hystrix (Hook.f.) N.E.Br. var. parvula L.C.Leach, accepted as Huernia hystrix (Hook.f.) N.E.Br. subsp. parvula (L.C.Leach) Bruyns, endemic
 Huernia ingeae Lavranos, accepted as Huernia barbata (Masson) Haw. subsp. ingeae (Lavranos) Bruyns, present
 Huernia insigniflora C.A.Maass, accepted as Huernia zebrina N.E.Br. subsp. insigniflora (C.A.Maass) Bruyns, endemic
 Huernia kennedyana Lavranos, endemic
 Huernia kirkii N.E.Br. indigenous
 Huernia loeseneriana Schltr. indigenous
 Huernia longii Pillans, endemic
 Huernia longii Pillans subsp. echidnopsioides (L.C.Leach) Bruyns, accepted as Huernia pillansii N.E.Br. subsp. echidnopsioides L.C.Leach, endemic
 Huernia longii Pillans subsp. longii,   endemic
 Huernia longituba N.E.Br. indigenous
 Huernia namaquensis Pillans, indigenous
 Huernia nouhuysii I.Verd. endemic
 Huernia ocellata (Jacq.) Schult. accepted as Huernia guttata (Masson) Haw. subsp. guttata,   present
 Huernia pendula E.A.Bruce, endemic
 Huernia piersii N.E.Br. endemic
 Huernia pillansii N.E.Br. endemic
 Huernia pillansii N.E.Br. subsp. echidnopsioides L.C.Leach, accepted as Huernia echidnopsioides (L.C.Leach) L.C.Leach, indigenous
 Huernia praestans N.E.Br. endemic
 Huernia primulina N.E.Br. var. primulina, accepted as Huernia thuretii F.Cels, present
 Huernia primulina N.E.Br. var. rugosa N.E.Br. accepted as Huernia thuretii F.Cels var. thuretii, present
 Huernia procumbens (R.A.Dyer) L.C.Leach, indigenous
 Huernia quinta (E.Phillips) A.C.White & B.Sloane, indigenous
 Huernia quinta (E.Phillips) A.C.White & B.Sloane var. blyderiverensis L.C.Leach, accepted as Huernia blyderiverensis (L.C.Leach) Bruyns, endemic
 Huernia reticulata (Masson) Haw. accepted as Huernia guttata (Masson) Haw. subsp. reticulata (Masson) Bruyns, endemic
 Huernia simplex N.E.Br. accepted as Huernia humilis (Masson) Haw. present
 Huernia stapelioides Schltr. indigenous
 Huernia thudichumii L.C.Leach, accepted as Huernia humilis (Masson) Haw. endemic
 Huernia thuretii F.Cels, indigenous
 Huernia thuretii F.Cels var. primulina (N.E.Br.) L.C.Leach, accepted as Huernia thuretii F.Cels, endemic
 Huernia transvaalensis Stent, endemic
 Huernia venusta (Masson) Haw. accepted as Huernia guttata (Masson) Haw. subsp. guttata, endemic
 Huernia whitesloaneana Nel, endemic
 Huernia witzenbergensis C.A.Luckh. endemic
 Huernia x distincta  N.E.Br. endemic
 Huernia zebrina N.E.Br. indigenous
 Huernia zebrina N.E.Br. subsp. insigniflora (C.A.Maass) Bruyns, endemic
 Huernia zebrina N.E.Br. subsp. magniflora (E.Phillips) L.C.Leach, accepted as Huernia zebrina N.E.Br. subsp. zebrina, indigenous
 Huernia zebrina N.E.Br. subsp. zebrina, indigenous
 Huernia zebrina N.E.Br. var. magniflora E.Phillips, accepted as Huernia zebrina N.E.Br. subsp. zebrina,   indigenous

Huerniopsis 
Genus Huerniopsis:
 Huerniopsis atrosanguinea (N.E.Br.) A.C.White & B.Sloane, accepted as Piaranthus atrosanguineus (N.E.Br.) Bruyns, present
 Huerniopsis decipiens N.E.Br. accepted as Piaranthus decipiens (N.E.Br.) Bruyns, present
 Huerniopsis gibbosa Nel, accepted as Piaranthus atrosanguineus (N.E.Br.) Bruyns

Ischnolepis 
Genus Ischnolepis:
 Ischnolepis natalensis (Schltr.) Venter, accepted as Petopentia natalensis (Schltr.) Bullock, endemic

Jasminonerium 
Genus Jasminonerium:
 Jasminonerium acuminatum (E.Mey.) Kuntze, accepted as Carissa bispinosa (L.) Desf. ex Brenan, indigenous
 Jasminonerium bispinosum (L.) Kuntze, accepted as Carissa bispinosa (L.) Desf. ex Brenan, indigenous
 Jasminonerium carandas Kuntze var. spinarum (L.) Kuntze, accepted as Carissa spinarum L. indigenous
 Jasminonerium edule (Vahl) Kuntze, accepted as Carissa spinarum L. indigenous
 Jasminonerium erythrocarpum (Eckl.) Kuntze, accepted as Carissa bispinosa (L.) Desf. ex Brenan, indigenous
 Jasminonerium ferox (E.Mey.) Kuntze, accepted as Carissa bispinosa (L.) Desf. ex Brenan, indigenous
 Jasminonerium grandiflorum (E.Mey.) Kuntze, accepted as Carissa macrocarpa (Eckl.) A.DC. indigenous
 Jasminonerium haematocarpum (Eckl.) Kuntze, accepted as Carissa bispinosa (L.) Desf. ex Brenan, indigenous
 Jasminonerium macrocarpum (Eckl.) Kuntze, accepted as Carissa macrocarpa (Eckl.) A.DC. indigenous

Kanahia 
Genus Kanahia:
 Kanahia laniflora (Forssk.) R.Br. indigenous

Lagarinthus 
Genus Lagarinthus:
 Lagarinthus filiformis E.Mey. accepted as Gomphocarpus filiformis (E.Mey.) D.Dietr. indigenous

Landolphia 
Genus Landolphia:
 Landolphia kirkii Dyer ex Hook.f. indigenous

Larryleachia 
Genus Larryleachia:
 Larryleachia cactiformis (Hook.) Plowes, indigenous
 Larryleachia cactiformis (Hook.) Plowes var. cactiformis,   indigenous
 Larryleachia cactiformis (Hook.) Plowes var. felina (D.T.Cole) Bruyns, endemic
 Larryleachia dinteri (A.Berger) Plowes, accepted as Larryleachia marlothii (N.E.Br.) Plowes, indigenous
 Larryleachia felina (D.T.Cole) Plowes, accepted as Larryleachia cactiformis (Hook.) Plowes var. felina (D.T.Cole) Bruyns, present
 Larryleachia marlothii (N.E.Br.) Plowes, indigenous
 Larryleachia perlata (Dinter) Plowes, indigenous
 Larryleachia picta (N.E.Br.) Plowes, indigenous
 Larryleachia similis (N.E.Br.) Plowes, accepted as Larryleachia cactiformis (Hook.) Plowes var. cactiformis,   endemic

Lavrania 
Genus Lavrania:
 Lavrania cactiformis (Hook.) Bruyns, accepted as Larryleachia cactiformis (Hook.) Plowes, present
 Lavrania marlothii (N.E.Br.) Bruyns, accepted as Larryleachia marlothii (N.E.Br.) Plowes, present
 Lavrania perlata (Dinter) Bruyns, accepted as Larryleachia perlata (Dinter) Plowes, present
 Lavrania picta (N.E.Br.) Bruyns, accepted as Larryleachia picta (N.E.Br.) Plowes, present
 Lavrania picta (N.E.Br.) Bruyns subsp. parvipunctata Bruyns, accepted as Larryleachia tirasmontana Plowes

Luckhoffia 
Genus Luckhoffia:
 Luckhoffia beukmanii (C.A.Luckh.) A.C.White & B.Sloane, accepted as X Hoodiapelia beukmanii  (C.A.Luckh.) G.D.Rowley, present

Macropetalum 
Genus Macropetalum:
 Macropetalum burchellii Decne. var. burchellii, accepted as Brachystelma burchellii (Decne.) Peckover var. burchellii, present
 Macropetalum burchellii Decne. var. grandiflora N.E.Br. accepted as Brachystelma burchellii (Decne.) Peckover var. burchellii, present

Marsdenia 
Genus Marsdenia:
 Marsdenia floribunda (E.Mey.) N.E.Br. accepted as Marsdenia dregea (Harv.) Schltr. indigenous
 Marsdenia macrantha (Klotzsch) Schltr. indigenous
 Marsdenia sylvestris (Retz.) P.I.Forst. indigenous

Microloma 
Genus Microloma:
 Microloma armatum (Thunb.) Schltr. indigenous
 Microloma armatum (Thunb.) Schltr. var. armatum, indigenous
 Microloma armatum (Thunb.) Schltr. var. burchellii (N.E.Br.) Bruyns, indigenous
 Microloma burchellii N.E.Br. accepted as Microloma armatum (Thunb.) Schltr. var. burchellii (N.E.Br.) Bruyns, present
 Microloma calycinum E.Mey. indigenous
 Microloma calycinum E.Mey. subsp. flavescens (E.Mey.) Wanntorp, accepted as Microloma calycinum E.Mey. present
 Microloma campanulatum Wanntorp, accepted as Microloma armatum (Thunb.) Schltr. var. armatum, present
 Microloma dregei (E.Mey.) Wanntorp, accepted as Microloma armatum (Thunb.) Schltr. var. armatum, present
 Microloma gibbosum N.E.Br. accepted as Microloma sagittatum (L.) R.Br. present
 Microloma glabratum E.Mey. accepted as Microloma sagittatum (L.) R.Br. present
 Microloma glabratum E.Mey. subsp. subglabratum Wanntorp, accepted as Microloma sagittatum (L.) R.Br. present
 Microloma hystricoides Wanntorp, accepted as Microloma armatum (Thunb.) Schltr. var. armatum, present
 Microloma incanum Decne. indigenous
 Microloma longitubum Schltr. indigenous
 Microloma namaquense Bolus, endemic
 Microloma poicilanthum H.Huber, indigenous
 Microloma sagittatum (L.) R.Br. endemic
 Microloma sagittatum (L.) R.Br. subsp. pillansii Wanntorp, accepted as Microloma sagittatum (L.) R.Br. present
 Microloma schaferi Dinter, accepted as Microloma penicillatum Schltr. 
 Microloma spinosum N.E.Br. subsp. dinteri (Schltr.) Wanntorp, accepted as Microloma armatum (Thunb.) Schltr. var. armatum 
 Microloma spinosum N.E.Br. subsp. spinosum,   accepted as Microloma armatum (Thunb.) Schltr. var. armatum,   present
 Microloma spinosum N.E.Br. subsp. velutinum Wanntorp, accepted as Microloma armatum (Thunb.) Schltr. var. armatum, present
 Microloma tenuifolium (L.) K.Schum. endemic
 Microloma viridiflorum N.E.Br. accepted as Microloma armatum (Thunb.) Schltr. var. burchellii (N.E.Br.) Bruyns, present

Miraglossum 
Genus Miraglossum:
 Miraglossum anomalum (N.E.Br.) Kupicha, endemic
 Miraglossum davyi (N.E.Br.) Kupicha, endemic
 Miraglossum laeve Kupicha, endemic
 Miraglossum pilosum (Schltr.) Kupicha, indigenous
 Miraglossum pulchellum (Schltr.) Kupicha, indigenous
 Miraglossum superbum Kupicha, endemic
 Miraglossum verticillare (Schltr.) Kupicha, endemic

Mondia 
Genus Mondia:
 Mondia whitei (Hook.f.) Skeels, indigenous

Nerium 
Genus Nerium:
 Nerium oleander L. not indigenous, naturalised, invasive

Notechidnopsis 
Genus Notechidnopsis:
 Notechidnopsis columnaris (Nel) Lavranos & Bleck, accepted as Richtersveldia columnaris (Nel) Meve & Liede, endemic
 Notechidnopsis tessellata (Pillans) Lavranos & Bleck, endemic

Oncinema 
Genus Oncinema:
 Oncinema lineare (L.f.) Bullock, indigenous

Oncinotis 
Genus Oncinotis:
 Oncinotis tenuiloba Stapf, indigenous

Ophionella 
Genus Ophionella:
 Ophionella arcuata (N.E.Br.) Bruyns, indigenous
 Ophionella arcuata (N.E.Br.) Bruyns subsp. arcuata,   endemic
 Ophionella arcuata (N.E.Br.) Bruyns subsp. mirkinii (Pillans) Bruyns, endemic
 Ophionella willowmorensis Bruyns, endemic

Orbea 
Genus Orbea:
 Orbea carnosa (Stent) Bruyns, indigenous
 Orbea carnosa (Stent) Bruyns subsp. carnosa, endemic
 Orbea carnosa (Stent) Bruyns subsp. keithii (R.A.Dyer) Bruyns, indigenous
 Orbea ciliata (Thunb.) L.C.Leach, endemic
 Orbea conjuncta (A.C.White & B.Sloane) Bruyns, endemic
 Orbea cooperi (N.E.Br.) L.C.Leach, indigenous
 Orbea elegans Plowes, endemic
 Orbea gerstneri (Letty) Bruyns, indigenous
 Orbea gerstneri (Letty) Bruyns subsp. elongata (R.A.Dyer) Bruyns, endemic
 Orbea gerstneri (Letty) Bruyns subsp. gerstneri, indigenous
 Orbea hardyi (R.A.Dyer) Bruyns, endemic
 Orbea irrorata (Masson) L.C.Leach, accepted as Orbea verrucosa (Masson) L.C.Leach, present
 Orbea knobelii (E.Phillips) Bruyns, indigenous
 Orbea longidens (N.E.Br.) L.C.Leach, indigenous
 Orbea longii (C.A.Luckh.) Bruyns, endemic
 Orbea lugardii (N.E.Br.) Bruyns, indigenous
 Orbea lutea (N.E.Br.) Bruyns, indigenous
 Orbea lutea (N.E.Br.) Bruyns subsp. lutea, indigenous
 Orbea lutea (N.E.Br.) Bruyns subsp. vaga (N.E.Br.) Bruyns, indigenous
 Orbea macloughlinii (I.Verd.) L.C.Leach, endemic
 Orbea maculata (N.E.Br.) L.C.Leach, indigenous
 Orbea maculata (N.E.Br.) L.C.Leach subsp. maculata, indigenous
 Orbea melanantha (Schltr.) Bruyns, indigenous
 Orbea miscella (N.E.Br.) Meve, endemic
 Orbea namaquensis (N.E.Br.) L.C.Leach, endemic
 Orbea paradoxa (I.Verd.) L.C.Leach, indigenous
 Orbea pulchella (Masson) L.C.Leach, endemic
 Orbea rangeana (Dinter & A.Berger) L.C.Leach, accepted as Orbea maculata (N.E.Br.) L.C.Leach subsp. rangeana (Dinter & A.Berger) Bruyns 
 Orbea rogersii (L.Bolus) Bruyns, indigenous
 Orbea speciosa L.C.Leach, accepted as Orbea macloughlinii (I.Verd.) L.C.Leach, present
 Orbea tapscottii (I.Verd.) L.C.Leach, indigenous
 Orbea ubomboensis (I.Verd.) Bruyns, accepted as Australluma ubomboensis (I.Verd.) Bruyns, indigenous
 Orbea variegata (L.) Haw. endemic
 Orbea verrucosa (Masson) L.C.Leach, endemic
 Orbea verrucosa (Masson) L.C.Leach var. fucosa (N.E.Br.) L.C.Leach, accepted as Orbea verrucosa (Masson) L.C.Leach, present
 Orbea verrucosa (Masson) L.C.Leach var. verrucosa,   accepted as Orbea verrucosa (Masson) L.C.Leach, present
 Orbea woodii (N.E.Br.) L.C.Leach, endemic

Orbeanthus 
Genus Orbeanthus:
 Orbeanthus conjunctus (A.C.White & B.Sloane) L.C.Leach, accepted as Orbea conjuncta (A.C.White & B.Sloane) Bruyns, present
 Orbeanthus hardyi (R.A.Dyer) L.C.Leach, accepted as Orbea hardyi (R.A.Dyer) Bruyns, present

Orbeopsis 
Genus Orbeopsis:
 Orbeopsis albocastanea (Marloth) L.C.Leach, accepted as Orbea albocastanea (Marloth) Bruyns 
 Orbeopsis gerstneri (Letty) L.C.Leach subsp. elongata (R.A.Dyer) L.C.Leach, accepted as Orbea gerstneri (Letty) Bruyns subsp. elongata (R.A.Dyer) Bruyns, present
 Orbeopsis gerstneri (Letty) L.C.Leach subsp. gerstneri, accepted as Orbea gerstneri (Letty) Bruyns subsp. gerstneri, present
 Orbeopsis knobelii (E.Phillips) L.C.Leach, accepted as Orbea knobelii (E.Phillips) Bruyns 
 Orbeopsis lutea (N.E.Br.) L.C.Leach subsp. lutea, accepted as Orbea lutea (N.E.Br.) Bruyns subsp. lutea,   present
 Orbeopsis lutea (N.E.Br.) L.C.Leach subsp. vaga (N.E.Br.) L.C.Leach, accepted as Orbea lutea (N.E.Br.) Bruyns subsp. vaga (N.E.Br.) Bruyns, present
 Orbeopsis melanantha (Schltr.) L.C.Leach, accepted as Orbea melanantha (Schltr.) Bruyns, present
 Orbeopsis tsumebensis (Oberm.) L.C.Leach, accepted as Orbea huillensis (Hiern) Bruyns subsp. huillensis 
 Orbeopsis valida (N.E.Br.) L.C.Leach, accepted as Orbea valida (N.E.Br.) Bruyns subsp. valida,   present

Orthanthera 
Genus Orthanthera:
 Orthanthera jasminiflora (Decne.) Schinz, indigenous

Pachycarpus 
Genus Pachycarpus:
 Pachycarpus acidostelma M.Glen & Nicholas, indigenous
 Pachycarpus appendiculatus E.Mey. indigenous
 Pachycarpus asperifolius Meisn. indigenous
 Pachycarpus campanulatus (Harv.) N.E.Br. indigenous
 Pachycarpus campanulatus (Harv.) N.E.Br. var. campanulatus,   indigenous
 Pachycarpus campanulatus (Harv.) N.E.Br. var. sutherlandii N.E.Br. indigenous
 Pachycarpus concolor E.Mey. indigenous
 Pachycarpus concolor E.Mey. subsp. arenicola Goyder, indigenous
 Pachycarpus concolor E.Mey. subsp. concolor,   indigenous
 Pachycarpus concolor E.Mey. subsp. transvaalensis (Schltr.) Goyder, indigenous
 Pachycarpus coronarius E.Mey. endemic
 Pachycarpus dealbatus E.Mey. indigenous
 Pachycarpus decorus N.E.Br. accepted as Pachycarpus concolor E.Mey. subsp. transvaalensis (Schltr.) Goyder, present
 Pachycarpus galpinii (Schltr.) N.E.Br. indigenous
 Pachycarpus grandiflorus (L.f.) E.Mey. indigenous
 Pachycarpus grandiflorus (L.f.) E.Mey. subsp. grandiflorus,   endemic
 Pachycarpus grandiflorus (L.f.) E.Mey. subsp. tomentosus (Schltr.) Goyder, indigenous
 Pachycarpus grandiflorus (L.f.) E.Mey. var. tomentosus (Schltr.) N.E.Br. accepted as Pachycarpus grandiflorus (L.f.) E.Mey. subsp. tomentosus (Schltr.) Goyder, present
 Pachycarpus lebomboensis D.M.N.Sm. endemic
 Pachycarpus linearis (E.Mey.) N.E.Br. endemic
 Pachycarpus mackenii (Harv.) N.E.Br. endemic
 Pachycarpus macrochilus (Schltr.) N.E.Br. indigenous
 Pachycarpus natalensis N.E.Br. endemic
 Pachycarpus plicatus N.E.Br. endemic
 Pachycarpus reflectens E.Mey. endemic
 Pachycarpus rigidus E.Mey. indigenous
 Pachycarpus rostratus N.E.Br. endemic
 Pachycarpus scaber (Harv.) N.E.Br. indigenous
 Pachycarpus schinzianus (Schltr.) N.E.Br. indigenous
 Pachycarpus schweinfurthii (N.E.Br.) Bullock, accepted as Pachycarpus lineolatus (Decne.) Bullock 
 Pachycarpus stenoglossus (E.Mey.) N.E.Br. endemic
 Pachycarpus suaveolens (Schltr.) Nicholas & Goyder, indigenous
 Pachycarpus transvaalensis (Schltr.) N.E.Br. accepted as Pachycarpus concolor E.Mey. subsp. transvaalensis (Schltr.) Goyder, indigenous
 Pachycarpus vexillaris E.Mey. indigenous

Pachycymbium 
Genus Pachycymbium:
 Pachycymbium carnosum (Stent) L.C.Leach, accepted as Orbea carnosa (Stent) Bruyns subsp. carnosa,   present
 Pachycymbium keithii (R.A.Dyer) L.C.Leach, accepted as Orbea carnosa (Stent) Bruyns subsp. keithii (R.A.Dyer) Bruyns, present
 Pachycymbium lancasteri Lavranos, accepted as Orbea carnosa (Stent) Bruyns subsp. keithii (R.A.Dyer) Bruyns, present
 Pachycymbium lugardii (N.E.Br.) M.G.Gilbert, accepted as Orbea lugardii (N.E.Br.) Bruyns 
 Pachycymbium miscellum (N.E.Br.) M.G.Gilbert, accepted as Orbea miscella (N.E.Br.) Meve, present
 Pachycymbium rogersii (L.Bolus) M.G.Gilbert, accepted as Orbea rogersii (L.Bolus) Bruyns, present
 Pachycymbium ubomboense (I.Verd.) M.G.Gilbert, accepted as Australluma ubomboensis (I.Verd.) Bruyns

Pachypodium 
Genus Pachypodium:
 Pachypodium bispinosum (L.f.) A.DC. endemic
 Pachypodium griquense L.Bolus, accepted as Pachypodium succulentum (L.f.) Sweet, indigenous
 Pachypodium jasminiflorum L.Bolus, accepted as Pachypodium succulentum (L.f.) Sweet, indigenous
 Pachypodium namaquanum (Wyley ex Harv.) Welw. indigenous
 Pachypodium saundersii N.E.Br. indigenous
 Pachypodium succulentum (L.f.) Sweet, endemic
 Pachypodium tomentosum G.Don, accepted as Pachypodium succulentum (L.f.) Sweet, indigenous
 Pachypodium tuberosum Lindl. accepted as Pachypodium succulentum (L.f.) Sweet, indigenous

Parapodium 
Genus Parapodium:
 Parapodium costatum E.Mey. indigenous
 Parapodium crispum N.E.Br. endemic
 Parapodium simile N.E.Br. endemic

Pectinaria 
Genus Pectinaria:
 Pectinaria arcuata N.E.Br. accepted as Ophionella arcuata (N.E.Br.) Bruyns subsp. arcuata,   present
 Pectinaria articulata]] (Aiton) Haw. indigenous
 Pectinaria articulata (Aiton) Haw. subsp. articulata,   endemic
 Pectinaria articulata (Aiton) Haw. subsp. asperiflora (N.E.Br.) Bruyns, endemic
 Pectinaria articulata (Aiton) Haw. subsp. borealis Bruyns, endemic
 Pectinaria articulata (Aiton) Haw. subsp. namaquensis (N.E.Br.) Bruyns, endemic
 Pectinaria articulata (Aiton) Haw. var. namaquensis N.E.Br. accepted as Pectinaria articulata (Aiton) Haw. subsp. namaquensis (N.E.Br.) Bruyns, present
 Pectinaria asperiflora N.E.Br. accepted as Pectinaria articulata (Aiton) Haw. subsp. asperiflora (N.E.Br.) Bruyns, present
 Pectinaria breviloba R.A.Dyer, accepted as Stapeliopsis breviloba (R.A.Dyer) Bruyns, present
 Pectinaria exasperata Bruyns, accepted as Stapeliopsis exasperata (Bruyns) Bruyns, present
 Pectinaria longipes (N.E.Br.) Bruyns, indigenous
 Pectinaria longipes (N.E.Br.) Bruyns subsp. longipes,   endemic
 Pectinaria longipes (N.E.Br.) Bruyns subsp. villetii (C.A.Luckh.) Bruyns, endemic
 Pectinaria maughanii (R.A.Dyer) Bruyns, endemic
 Pectinaria pillansii N.E.Br. accepted as Stapeliopsis pillansii (N.E.Br.) Bruyns, present
 Pectinaria saxatilis N.E.Br. accepted as Stapeliopsis saxatilis (N.E.Br.) Bruyns, indigenous
 Pectinaria stayneri M.B.Bayer, accepted as Stapeliopsis stayneri (M.B.Bayer) Bruyns, indigenous
 Pectinaria tulipiflora C.A.Luckh. accepted as Stapeliopsis saxatilis (N.E.Br.) Bruyns, indigenous

Pentarrhinum 
Genus Pentarrhinum:
 Pentarrhinum abyssinicum Decne. indigenous
 Pentarrhinum abyssinicum Decne. subsp. abyssinicum, indigenous
 Pentarrhinum insipidum E.Mey. indigenous

Pentopetia 
Genus Pentopetia:
 Pentopetia natalensis Schltr. accepted as Petopentia natalensis (Schltr.) Bullock, indigenous

Pergularia 
Genus Pergularia:
 Pergularia daemia (Forssk.) Chiov. indigenous
 Pergularia daemia (Forssk.) Chiov. subsp. daemia, indigenous
 Pergularia daemia (Forssk.) Chiov. subsp. garipensis (E.Mey.) Goyder, indigenous
 Pergularia daemia (Forssk.) Chiov. var. daemia, accepted as Pergularia daemia (Forssk.) Chiov. subsp. daemia 
 Pergularia daemia (Forssk.) Chiov. var. leiocarpa (K.Schum.) H.Huber, accepted as Pergularia daemia (Forssk.) Chiov. subsp. garipensis (E.Mey.) Goyder, indigenous

Periglossum 
Genus Periglossum:
 Periglossum angustifolium Decne. indigenous
 Periglossum kassnerianum Schltr. accepted as Periglossum mackenii Harv. present
 Periglossum mackenii Harv. indigenous
 Periglossum mossambicense Schltr. accepted as Periglossum mackenii Harv. 
 Periglossum podoptyches Nicholas & Bester, endemic

Petopentia 
Genus Petopentia:
 Petopentia natalensis (Schltr.) Bullock, endemic
 Petopentia undulata Venter & A.M.Venter, endemic

Piaranthus 
Genus Piaranthus:
 Piaranthus atrosanguineus (N.E.Br.) Bruyns, indigenous
 Piaranthus barrydalensis Meve, accepted as Piaranthus geminatus (Masson) N.E.Br. subsp. geminatus, endemic
 Piaranthus comptus N.E.Br. endemic
 Piaranthus comptus N.E.Br. var. ciliatus N.E.Br. accepted as Piaranthus comptus N.E.Br. present
 Piaranthus cornutus N.E.Br. var. cornutus, indigenous
 Piaranthus decipiens (N.E.Br.) Bruyns, indigenous
 Piaranthus decorus (Masson) N.E.Br. subsp. cornutus (N.E.Br.) Meve, accepted as Piaranthus geminatus (Masson) N.E.Br. subsp. decorus (Masson) Bruyns, indigenous
 Piaranthus decorus (Masson) N.E.Br. subsp. decorus,   accepted as Piaranthus geminatus (Masson) N.E.Br. subsp. decorus (Masson) Bruyns, endemic
 Piaranthus disparilis N.E.Br. accepted as Piaranthus geminatus (Masson) N.E.Br. subsp. geminatus, present
 Piaranthus foetidus N.E.Br. accepted as Piaranthus geminatus (Masson) N.E.Br. subsp. geminatus, present
 Piaranthus foetidus N.E.Br. var. diversus N.E.Br. accepted as Piaranthus geminatus (Masson) N.E.Br. subsp. geminatus, present
 Piaranthus foetidus N.E.Br. var. multipunctatus N.E.Br. accepted as Piaranthus geminatus (Masson) N.E.Br. subsp. geminatus, present
 Piaranthus foetidus N.E.Br. var. pallidus N.E.Br. accepted as Piaranthus geminatus (Masson) N.E.Br. subsp. geminatus, present
 Piaranthus foetidus N.E.Br. var. purpureus N.E.Br. accepted as Piaranthus geminatus (Masson) N.E.Br. subsp. geminatus, present
 Piaranthus framesii Pillans, accepted as Piaranthus punctatus (Masson) R.Br. var. framesii (Pillans) Bruyns, endemic
 Piaranthus geminatus (Masson) N.E.Br. indigenous
 Piaranthus geminatus (Masson) N.E.Br. subsp. decorus (Masson) Bruyns, indigenous
 Piaranthus geminatus (Masson) N.E.Br. subsp. geminatus, endemic
 Piaranthus geminatus (Masson) N.E.Br. var. foetidus (N.E.Br.) Meve, accepted as Piaranthus geminatus (Masson) N.E.Br. subsp. geminatus, endemic
 Piaranthus geminatus (Masson) N.E.Br. var. geminatus, accepted as Piaranthus geminatus (Masson) N.E.Br. subsp. geminatus, endemic
 Piaranthus globosus A.C.White & B.Sloane, accepted as Piaranthus geminatus (Masson) N.E.Br. subsp. geminatus,   present
 Piaranthus mennellii C.A.Luckh. accepted as Piaranthus geminatus (Masson) N.E.Br. subsp. decorus (Masson) Bruyns, present
 Piaranthus pallidus C.A.Luckh. accepted as Piaranthus geminatus (Masson) N.E.Br. subsp. decorus (Masson) Bruyns, present
 Piaranthus parvulus N.E.Br. endemic
 Piaranthus pillansii N.E.Br. var. inconstans N.E.Br. accepted as Piaranthus geminatus (Masson) N.E.Br. subsp. geminatus, present
 Piaranthus pillansii N.E.Br. var. pillansii, accepted as Piaranthus geminatus (Masson) N.E.Br. subsp. geminatus, present
 Piaranthus pulcher N.E.Br. accepted as Piaranthus geminatus (Masson) N.E.Br. subsp. decorus (Masson) Bruyns, present
 Piaranthus pulcher N.E.Br. var. nebrownii (Dinter) A.C.White & B.Sloane, accepted as Piaranthus geminatus (Masson) N.E.Br. subsp. decorus (Masson) Bruyns, present
 Piaranthus punctatus (Masson) R.Br. indigenous
 Piaranthus punctatus (Masson) R.Br. var. framesii (Pillans) Bruyns, endemic
 Piaranthus punctatus (Masson) R.Br. var. punctatus, endemic
 Piaranthus ruschii Nel, accepted as Piaranthus cornutus N.E.Br. var. ruschii (Nel) Bruyns

Quaqua 
Genus Quaqua:
 Quaqua acutiloba (N.E.Br.) Bruyns, indigenous
 Quaqua arenicola (N.E.Br.) Plowes, indigenous
 Quaqua arenicola (N.E.Br.) Plowes subsp. arenicola, endemic
 Quaqua arenicola (N.E.Br.) Plowes subsp. pilifera (Bruyns) Bruyns, endemic
 Quaqua armata (N.E.Br.) Bruyns, indigenous
 Quaqua armata (N.E.Br.) Bruyns subsp. arenicola (N.E.Br.) Bruyns, accepted as Quaqua arenicola (N.E.Br.) Plowes subsp. arenicola, present
 Quaqua armata (N.E.Br.) Bruyns subsp. armata, endemic
 Quaqua armata (N.E.Br.) Bruyns subsp. maritima Bruyns, endemic
 Quaqua armata (N.E.Br.) Bruyns subsp. pilifera Bruyns, accepted as Quaqua arenicola (N.E.Br.) Plowes subsp. pilifera (Bruyns) Bruyns, present
 Quaqua aurea (C.A.Luckh.) Plowes, endemic
 Quaqua bayeriana (Bruyns) Plowes, endemic
 Quaqua cincta (C.A.Luckh.) Bruyns, endemic
 Quaqua framesii (Pillans) Bruyns, endemic
 Quaqua incarnata (L.f.) Bruyns, indigenous
 Quaqua incarnata (L.f.) Bruyns subsp. aurea (C.A.Luckh.) Bruyns, accepted as Quaqua aurea (C.A.Luckh.) Plowes, present
 Quaqua incarnata (L.f.) Bruyns subsp. hottentotorum (N.E.Br.) Bruyns, indigenous
 Quaqua incarnata (L.f.) Bruyns subsp. incarnata, endemic
 Quaqua incarnata (L.f.) Bruyns subsp. incarnata var. tentaculata,   accepted as Quaqua incarnata (L.f.) Bruyns subsp. tentaculata (Bruyns) Bruyns, present
 Quaqua incarnata (L.f.) Bruyns subsp. tentaculata (Bruyns) Bruyns, endemic
 Quaqua inversa (N.E.Br.) Bruyns, endemic
 Quaqua inversa (N.E.Br.) Bruyns var. cincta (C.A.Luckh.) Bruyns, accepted as Quaqua cincta (C.A.Luckh.) Bruyns, present
 Quaqua linearis (N.E.Br.) Bruyns, endemic
 Quaqua mammillaris (L.) Bruyns, indigenous
 Quaqua marlothii (N.E.Br.) Bruyns, accepted as Quaqua arida (N.E.Br.) Plowes, endemic
 Quaqua multiflora (R.A.Dyer) Bruyns, endemic
 Quaqua pallens Bruyns, endemic
 Quaqua parviflora (Masson) Bruyns, indigenous
 Quaqua parviflora (Masson) Bruyns subsp. bayeriana Bruyns, accepted as Quaqua bayeriana (Bruyns) Plowes, present
 Quaqua parviflora (Masson) Bruyns subsp. confusa (Plowes) Bruyns, endemic
 Quaqua parviflora (Masson) Bruyns subsp. dependens (N.E.Br.) Bruyns, endemic
 Quaqua parviflora (Masson) Bruyns subsp. gracilis (C.A.Luckh.) Bruyns, endemic
 Quaqua parviflora (Masson) Bruyns subsp. parviflora, endemic
 Quaqua parviflora (Masson) Bruyns subsp. pulchra Bruyns, accepted as Quaqua pulchra (Bruyns) Plowes, present
 Quaqua parviflora (Masson) Bruyns subsp. swanepoelii (Lavranos) Bruyns, endemic
 Quaqua pillansii (N.E.Br.) Bruyns, endemic
 Quaqua pruinosa (Masson) Bruyns, indigenous
 Quaqua pulchra (Bruyns) Plowes, endemic
 Quaqua ramosa (Masson) Bruyns, endemic

Raphionacme 
Genus Raphionacme:
 Raphionacme burkei N.E.Br. accepted as Raphionacme velutina Schltr. present
 Raphionacme dyeri Retief & Venter, indigenous
 Raphionacme elata N.E.Br. accepted as Raphionacme galpinii Schltr. present
 Raphionacme elsana Venter & R.L.Verh. endemic
 Raphionacme flanaganii Schltr. indigenous
 Raphionacme galpinii Schltr. indigenous
 Raphionacme hirsuta (E.Mey.) R.A.Dyer, indigenous
 Raphionacme lobulata Venter & R.L.Verh. accepted as Chlorocyathus lobulata (Venter & R.L.Verh.) Venter, endemic
 Raphionacme lucens Venter & R.L.Verh. endemic
 Raphionacme monteiroae (Oliv.) N.E.Br. accepted as Chlorocyathus monteiroae Oliv. indigenous
 Raphionacme palustris Venter & R.L.Verh. endemic
 Raphionacme procumbens Schltr. indigenous
 Raphionacme velutina Schltr. indigenous
 Raphionacme villicorona Venter, indigenous
 Raphionacme zeyheri Harv. endemic

Rauvolfia 
Genus Rauvolfia:
 Rauvolfia caffra Sond. indigenous

Rhyssolobium 
Genus Rhyssolobium:
 Rhyssolobium dumosum E.Mey. indigenous

Richtersveldia 
Genus Richtersveldia:
 Richtersveldia columnaris (Nel) Meve & Liede, endemic

Riocreuxia 
Genus Riocreuxia:
 Riocreuxia aberrans R.A.Dyer, endemic
 Riocreuxia alexandrina (H.Huber) R.A.Dyer, accepted as Riocreuxia flanaganii Schltr. var. alexandria H.Huber, endemic
 Riocreuxia bolusii N.E.Br. accepted as Riocreuxia torulosa (E.Mey.) Decne. var. bolusii (N.E.Br.) Masinde, endemic
 Riocreuxia burchellii K.Schum. accepted as Riocreuxia polyantha Schltr. present
 Riocreuxia flanaganii Schltr. endemic
 Riocreuxia flanaganii Schltr. subsp. segregata R.A.Dyer, accepted as Riocreuxia polyantha Schltr. 
 Riocreuxia flanaganii Schltr. var. alexandria H.Huber, indigenous
 Riocreuxia flanaganii Schltr. var. flanaganii, endemic
 Riocreuxia picta Schltr. indigenous
 Riocreuxia polyantha Schltr. indigenous
 Riocreuxia torulosa (E.Mey.) Decne. var. bolusii (N.E.Br.) Masinde, indigenous
 Riocreuxia torulosa (E.Mey.) Decne. var. torulosa, indigenous
 Riocreuxia torulosa Decne. indigenous
 Riocreuxia woodii N.E.Br. endemic

Sarcostemma 
Genus Sarcostemma:
 Sarcostemma pearsonii N.E.Br. accepted as Cynanchum pearsonianum Liede & Meve, indigenous
 Sarcostemma tetrapterum Turcz. accepted as Cynanchum tetrapterum (Turcz.) R.A.Dyer ex Bullock, present
 Sarcostemma thunbergii G.Don, accepted as Cynanchum viminale (L.) Bassi subsp. thunbergii (G.Don) Liede & Meve, indigenous
 Sarcostemma viminale (L.) R.Br. accepted as Cynanchum viminale (L.) Bassi subsp. viminale,   indigenous
 Sarcostemma viminale (L.) R.Br. subsp. orangeanum Liede & Meve, accepted as Cynanchum viminale (L.) Bassi subsp. orangeanum (Liede & Meve) Liede & Meve, endemic
 Sarcostemma viminale (L.) R.Br. subsp. suberosum Meve & Liede, accepted as Cynanchum viminale (L.) Bassi subsp. suberosum (Meve & Liede) Goyder, indigenous
 Sarcostemma viminale (L.) R.Br. subsp. thunbergii (G.Don) Liede & Meve, accepted as Cynanchum viminale (L.) Bassi subsp. thunbergii (G.Don) Liede & Meve, indigenous

Schizoglossum 
Genus Schizoglossum:
 Schizoglossum amatolicum Hilliard, endemic
 Schizoglossum aschersonianum Schltr. indigenous
 Schizoglossum aschersonianum Schltr. var. aschersonianum, endemic
 Schizoglossum aschersonianum Schltr. var. longipes N.E.Br. endemic
 Schizoglossum aschersonianum Schltr. var. pygmaeum (Schltr.) N.E.Br. endemic
 Schizoglossum aschersonianum Schltr. var. radiatum N.E.Br. endemic
 Schizoglossum atropurpureum E.Mey. indigenous
 Schizoglossum atropurpureum]] E.Mey. subsp. atropurpureum, indigenous
 Schizoglossum atropurpureum E.Mey. subsp. tridentatum (Schltr.) Kupicha, endemic
 Schizoglossum atropurpureum E.Mey. subsp. virens (E.Mey.) Kupicha, endemic
 Schizoglossum austromontanum Bester & Nicholas, endemic
 Schizoglossum bidens E.Mey. indigenous
 Schizoglossum bidens E.Mey. subsp. atrorubens (Schltr.) Kupicha, endemic
 Schizoglossum bidens E.Mey. subsp. bidens,   indigenous
 Schizoglossum bidens E.Mey. subsp. galpinii (Schltr.) Kupicha, indigenous
 Schizoglossum bidens E.Mey. subsp. gracile Kupicha, endemic
 Schizoglossum bidens E.Mey. subsp. hirtum Kupicha, endemic
 Schizoglossum bidens E.Mey. subsp. pachyglossum (Schltr.) Kupicha, indigenous
 Schizoglossum bidens E.Mey. subsp. productum (N.E.Br.) Kupicha, endemic
 Schizoglossum capitatum Schltr. accepted as Asclepias dissona N.E.Br. present
 Schizoglossum cordifolium E.Mey. indigenous
 Schizoglossum crassipes S.Moore, indigenous
 Schizoglossum elingue N.E.Br. indigenous
 Schizoglossum elingue N.E.Br. subsp. elingue,   endemic
 Schizoglossum elingue N.E.Br. subsp. purpureum Kupicha, indigenous
 Schizoglossum eustegioides (E.Mey.) Druce, endemic
 Schizoglossum filiforme (E.Mey.) Druce, accepted as Gomphocarpus filiformis (E.Mey.) D.Dietr. indigenous
 Schizoglossum flavum Schltr. endemic
 Schizoglossum garcianum Schltr. indigenous
 Schizoglossum hamatum E.Mey. endemic
 Schizoglossum hilliardiae Kupicha, endemic
 Schizoglossum ingomense N.E.Br. endemic
 Schizoglossum linifolium Schltr. indigenous
 Schizoglossum linifolium Schltr. var. centrirostratum N.E.Br. endemic
 Schizoglossum linifolium Schltr. var. linifolium, indigenous
 Schizoglossum montanum R.A.Dyer, indigenous
 Schizoglossum nitidum Schltr. indigenous
 Schizoglossum peglerae N.E.Br. endemic
 Schizoglossum periglossoides Schltr. endemic
 Schizoglossum quadridens N.E.Br. endemic
 Schizoglossum rubiginosum Hilliard, endemic
 Schizoglossum singulare Kupicha, endemic
 Schizoglossum stenoglossum Schltr. indigenous
 Schizoglossum stenoglossum Schltr. subsp. flavum (N.E.Br.) Kupicha, endemic
 Schizoglossum stenoglossum Schltr. subsp. latifolium Kupicha, endemic
 Schizoglossum stenoglossum Schltr. subsp. stenoglossum, endemic
 Schizoglossum umbelluliferum Schltr. accepted as Stenostelma umbelluliferum (Schltr.) Bester & Nicholas, endemic

Schizostephanus 
Genus Schizostephanus:
 Schizostephanus alatus Hochst. ex K.Schum. indigenous

Secamone 
Genus Secamone:
 Secamone acutifolia Sond. accepted as Cryptolepis oblongifolia (Meisn.) Schltr. 
 Secamone alpini Schult. indigenous
 Secamone delagoensis Schltr. indigenous
 Secamone filiformis (L.f.) J.H.Ross, indigenous
 Secamone gerrardii Harv. ex Benth. indigenous
 Secamone parvifolia (Oliv.) Bullock, indigenous
 Secamone zambeziaca Schltr. var. parvifolia N.E.Br. accepted as Secamone parvifolia (Oliv.) Bullock

Sisyranthus 
Genus Sisyranthus:
 Sisyranthus anceps Schltr. endemic
 Sisyranthus barbatus (Turcz.) N.E.Br. endemic
 Sisyranthus compactus N.E.Br. endemic
 Sisyranthus fanniniae N.E.Br. endemic
 Sisyranthus franksiae N.E.Br. endemic
 Sisyranthus huttoniae (S.Moore) S.Moore, indigenous
 Sisyranthus imberbis Harv. indigenous
 Sisyranthus macer (E.Mey.) Schltr. endemic
 Sisyranthus randii S.Moore, indigenous
 Sisyranthus saundersiae N.E.Br. endemic
 Sisyranthus trichostomus K.Schum. endemic
 Sisyranthus virgatus E.Mey. indigenous

Sphaerocodon 
Genus Sphaerocodon:
 Sphaerocodon natalense (Meisn.) Hook.f. indigenous

Stapelia 
Genus Stapelia:
 Stapelia acuminata Masson, endemic
 Stapelia arenosa C.A.Luckh. endemic
 Stapelia asterias Masson, accepted as Stapelia hirsuta L. var. hirsuta, endemic
 Stapelia barklyi N.E.Br. accepted as Orbea hybrid, present
 Stapelia baylissii L.C.Leach, accepted as Stapelia hirsuta L. var. baylissii (L.C.Leach) Bruyns, endemic
 Stapelia cactiformis Hook. accepted as Larryleachia cactiformis (Hook.) Plowes var. cactiformis, present
 Stapelia caespitosa Masson var. caespitosa, accepted as Duvalia caespitosa (Masson) Haw. subsp. caespitosa, present
 Stapelia caroli-schmidtii Dinter & A.Berger, accepted as Orbea albocastanea (Marloth) Bruyns 
 Stapelia cedrimontana Frandsen, endemic
 Stapelia clavicorona I.Verd. endemic
 Stapelia conspurcata Willd. accepted as Orbea variegata (L.) Haw. present
 Stapelia divaricata Masson, endemic
 Stapelia engleriana Schltr. endemic
 Stapelia erectiflora N.E.Br. indigenous
 Stapelia erectiflora N.E.Br. var. erectiflora, endemic
 Stapelia erectiflora N.E.Br. var. prostratiflora L.C.Leach, endemic
 Stapelia flavopurpurea Marloth, indigenous
 Stapelia gariepensis Pillans, accepted as Stapelia hirsuta L. var. gariepensis (Pillans) Bruyns, indigenous
 Stapelia gettliffei R.Pott, indigenous
 Stapelia gigantea N.E.Br. indigenous
 Stapelia glabricaulis N.E.Br. accepted as Stapelia hirsuta L. var. tsomoensis (N.E.Br.) Bruyns, endemic
 Stapelia glanduliflora Masson, endemic
 Stapelia grandiflora Masson, indigenous
 Stapelia grandiflora Masson var. conformis (N.E.Br.) Bruyns, endemic
 Stapelia grandiflora Masson var. grandiflora, indigenous
 Stapelia hirsuta L. indigenous
 Stapelia hirsuta L. var. baylissii (L.C.Leach) Bruyns, endemic
 Stapelia hirsuta L. var. gariepensis (Pillans) Bruyns, indigenous
 Stapelia hirsuta L. var. hirsuta,   indigenous
 Stapelia hirsuta L. var. tsomoensis (N.E.Br.) Bruyns, endemic
 Stapelia hirsuta L. var. vetula (Masson) Bruyns, endemic
 Stapelia immelmaniae Pillans, accepted as Stapelia paniculata Willd. subsp. paniculata, endemic
 Stapelia kougabergensis L.C.Leach, accepted as Stapelia paniculata Willd. subsp. kougabergensis (L.C.Leach) Bruyns, endemic
 Stapelia kwebensis N.E.Br. indigenous
 Stapelia leendertziae N.E.Br. indigenous
 Stapelia longipedicellata (A.Berger) L.C.Leach, accepted as Stapelia kwebensis N.E.Br. 
 Stapelia macowanii N.E.Br. var. conformis (N.E.Br.) L.C.Leach, accepted as Stapelia grandiflora Masson var. conformis (N.E.Br.) Bruyns, indigenous
 Stapelia macowanii N.E.Br. var. macowanii,   accepted as Stapelia grandiflora Masson var. conformis (N.E.Br.) Bruyns, endemic
 Stapelia meintjesii Verd. endemic
 Stapelia montana L.C.Leach var. grossa L.C.Leach, accepted as Stapelia cedrimontana Frandsen, endemic
 Stapelia montana L.C.Leach var. montana, accepted as Stapelia cedrimontana Frandsen, endemic
 Stapelia obducta L.C.Leach, endemic
 Stapelia olivacea N.E.Br. endemic
 Stapelia paniculata Willd. indigenous
 Stapelia paniculata Willd. subsp. kougabergensis (L.C.Leach) Bruyns, endemic
 Stapelia paniculata Willd. subsp. paniculata, endemic
 Stapelia paniculata Willd. subsp. scitula (L.C.Leach) Bruyns, endemic
 Stapelia peglerae N.E.Br. accepted as Stapelia hirsuta L. var. tsomoensis (N.E.Br.) Bruyns, endemic
 Stapelia pillansii N.E.Br. var. fontinalis Nel, accepted as Stapelia pillansii N.E.Br. endemic
 Stapelia pillansii N.E.Br. var. pillansii,   accepted as Stapelia pillansii N.E.Br. endemic
 Stapelia praetermissa L.C.Leach var. luteola L.C.Leach, accepted as Stapelia hirsuta L. var. baylissii (L.C.Leach) Bruyns, endemic
 Stapelia praetermissa L.C.Leach var. praetermissa,   accepted as Stapelia hirsuta L. var. baylissii (L.C.Leach) Bruyns, endemic
 Stapelia pulvinata Masson, accepted as Stapelia hirsuta L. var. hirsuta,   present
 Stapelia rubiginosa Nel, endemic
 Stapelia rufa Masson, endemic
 Stapelia scitula L.C.Leach, accepted as Stapelia paniculata Willd. subsp. scitula (L.C.Leach) Bruyns, endemic
 Stapelia similis N.E.Br. indigenous
 Stapelia surrecta N.E.Br. endemic
 Stapelia tsomoensis N.E.Br. accepted as Stapelia hirsuta L. var. tsomoensis (N.E.Br.) Bruyns, endemic
 Stapelia unicornis C.A.Luckh. indigenous
 Stapelia vetula Masson, accepted as Stapelia hirsuta L. var. vetula (Masson) Bruyns, present
 Stapelia villetiae C.A.Luckh. endemic
 Stapelia x meintjiesii  I.Verd. endemic

Stapeliopsis 
Genus Stapeliopsis:
 Stapeliopsis breviloba (R.A.Dyer) Bruyns, endemic
 Stapeliopsis cooperi (N.E.Br.) E.Phillips, accepted as Orbea cooperi (N.E.Br.) L.C.Leach 
 Stapeliopsis exasperata (Bruyns) Bruyns, endemic
 Stapeliopsis khamiesbergensis Bruyns, endemic
 Stapeliopsis neronis Pillans, indigenous
 Stapeliopsis pillansii (N.E.Br.) Bruyns, endemic
 Stapeliopsis saxatilis (N.E.Br.) Bruyns, endemic
 Stapeliopsis saxatilis (N.E.Br.) Bruyns subsp. stayneri (M.B.Bayer) Bruyns, accepted as Stapeliopsis stayneri (M.B.Bayer) Bruyns, endemic
 Stapeliopsis stayneri (M.B.Bayer) Bruyns, endemic
 Stapeliopsis urniflora Lavranos, indigenous

Stenostelma 
Genus Stenostelma:
 Stenostelma capense Schltr. indigenous
 Stenostelma corniculatum (E.Mey.) Bullock, indigenous
 Stenostelma eminens (Harv.) Bullock, accepted as Asclepias eminens (Harv.) Schltr. present
 Stenostelma umbelluliferum (Schltr.) Bester & Nicholas, endemic

Stomatostemma 
Genus Stomatostemma:
 Stomatostemma monteiroae (Oliv.) N.E.Br. indigenous

Strophanthus 
Genus Strophanthus:
 Strophanthus gerrardii Stapf, indigenous
 Strophanthus kombe Oliv. indigenous
 Strophanthus luteolus Codd, indigenous
 Strophanthus petersianus Klotzsch, indigenous
 Strophanthus speciosus (Ward & Harv.) Reber, indigenous

Tabernaemontana 
Genus Tabernaemontana:
 Tabernaemontana elegans Stapf, indigenous
 Tabernaemontana ventricosa Hochst. ex A.DC. indigenous

Tacazzea 
Genus Tacazzea:
 Tacazzea apiculata Oliv. indigenous
 Tacazzea natalensis (Schltr.) N.E.Br. accepted as Petopentia natalensis (Schltr.) Bullock, indigenous

Tavaresia 
Genus Tavaresia:
 Tavaresia barklyi (Dyer) N.E.Br. indigenous
 Tavaresia grandiflora (Dinter) A.Berger, accepted as Tavaresia barklyi (Dyer) N.E.Br. present
 Tavaresia meintjesii R.A.Dyer, indigenous

Telosma 
Genus Telosma:
 Telosma africana (N.E.Br.) N.E.Br. indigenous

Tenaris 
Genus Tenaris:
 Tenaris chlorantha Schltr. accepted as Brachystelma chloranthum (Schltr.) Peckover, present
 Tenaris christianeae (Peckover) J.Victor & Nicholas, accepted as Brachystelma christianeae Peckover, present
 Tenaris filifolia N.E.Br. accepted as Brachystelma filifolium (N.E.Br.) Peckover, present
 Tenaris rubella E.Mey. accepted as Brachystelma rubellum (E.Mey.) Peckover, present
 Tenaris schultzei (Schltr.) E.Phillips, accepted as Brachystelma schultzei (Schltr.) Bruyns

Thevetia 
Genus Thevetia:
 Thevetia peruviana (Pers.) K.Schum. accepted as Cascabela thevetia (L.) Lippold, not indigenous, naturalised, invasive

Trachycalymma 
Genus Trachycalymma:
 Trachycalymma cucullatum (Schltr.) Bullock, accepted as Asclepias cucullata (Schltr.) Schltr. subsp. cucullata, present

Trichocaulon 
Genus Trichocaulon:
 Trichocaulon alstonii N.E.Br. accepted as Hoodia alstonii (N.E.Br.) Plowes, present
 Trichocaulon annulatum N.E.Br. accepted as Hoodia pilifera (L.f.) Plowes subsp. annulata (N.E.Br.) Bruyns, present
 Trichocaulon cactiforme (Hook.) N.E.Br. accepted as Larryleachia cactiformis (Hook.) Plowes var. cactiformis, present
 Trichocaulon cinereum Pillans, accepted as Larryleachia perlata (Dinter) Plowes, present
 Trichocaulon delaetianum Dinter, accepted as Hoodia officinalis (N.E.Br.) Plowes subsp. delaetiana (Dinter) Bruyns 
 Trichocaulon dinteri A.Berger, accepted as Larryleachia marlothii (N.E.Br.) Plowes 
 Trichocaulon engleri Dinter, accepted as Larryleachia meloformis (Marloth) Plowes 
 Trichocaulon felinum D.T.Cole, accepted as Larryleachia cactiformis (Hook.) Plowes var. felina (D.T.Cole) Bruyns, present
 Trichocaulon flavum N.E.Br. accepted as Hoodia flava (N.E.Br.) Plowes, present
 Trichocaulon grande N.E.Br. accepted as Hoodia grandis (N.E.Br.) Plowes, present
 Trichocaulon halenbergense Dinter, accepted as Hoodia alstonii (N.E.Br.) Plowes 
 Trichocaulon keetmanshoopense Dinter, accepted as Larryleachia marlothii (N.E.Br.) Plowes 
 Trichocaulon kubusense Nel, accepted as Larryleachia perlata (Dinter) Plowes, present
 Trichocaulon marlothii N.E.Br. accepted as Larryleachia marlothii (N.E.Br.) Plowes, present
 Trichocaulon meloforme Marloth, accepted as Larryleachia meloformis (Marloth) Plowes, present
 Trichocaulon officinale N.E.Br. accepted as Hoodia officinalis (N.E.Br.) Plowes subsp. officinalis, present
 Trichocaulon pedicellatum Schinz, accepted as Hoodia pedicellata (Schinz) Plowes 
 Trichocaulon perlatum Dinter, accepted as Larryleachia perlata (Dinter) Plowes 
 Trichocaulon pictum N.E.Br. accepted as Larryleachia picta (N.E.Br.) Plowes, present
 Trichocaulon piliferum (L.f.) N.E.Br. accepted as Hoodia pilifera (L.f.) Plowes subsp. pilifera, present
 Trichocaulon pillansii N.E.Br. accepted as Hoodia grandis (N.E.Br.) Plowes, present
 Trichocaulon pubiflorum Dinter, accepted as Hoodia officinalis (N.E.Br.) Plowes subsp. officinalis 
 Trichocaulon rusticum N.E.Br. accepted as Hoodia officinalis (N.E.Br.) Plowes subsp. officinalis, present
 Trichocaulon simile N.E.Br. accepted as Larryleachia cactiformis (Hook.) Plowes var. cactiformis, present
 Trichocaulon sinus-luederitzii Dinter, accepted as Larryleachia marlothii (N.E.Br.) Plowes 
 Trichocaulon sociarum A.C.White & B.Sloane, accepted as Larryleachia sociarum (A.C.White & B.Sloane) Plowes 
 Trichocaulon triebneri Nel, accepted as Hoodia triebneri (Nel) Bruyns 
 Trichocaulon truncatum Pillans, accepted as Larryleachia perlata (Dinter) Plowes, present

Tridentea 
Genus Tridentea:
 Tridentea aperta (Masson) L.C.Leach, accepted as Tromotriche aperta (Masson) Bruyns, present
 Tridentea baylissii (L.C.Leach) L.C.Leach var. baylissii,   accepted as Tromotriche baylissii (L.C.Leach) Bruyns, present
 Tridentea baylissii (L.C.Leach) L.C.Leach var. ciliata L.C.Leach, accepted as Tromotriche baylissii (L.C.Leach) Bruyns, present
 Tridentea choanantha (Lavranos & H.Hall) L.C.Leach, accepted as Tromotriche choanantha (Lavranos & H.Hall) Bruyns, present
 Tridentea dwequensis (C.A.Luckh.) L.C.Leach, endemic
 Tridentea gemmiflora (Masson) Haw. indigenous
 Tridentea herrei (Nel) L.C.Leach, accepted as Tromotriche herrei (Nel) Bruyns, present
 Tridentea jucunda (N.E.Br.) L.C.Leach, indigenous
 Tridentea jucunda (N.E.Br.) L.C.Leach var. cincta (Marloth) L.C.Leach, accepted as Tridentea jucunda (N.E.Br.) L.C.Leach, present
 Tridentea jucunda (N.E.Br.) L.C.Leach var. dinter (A.Berger) L.C.Leach, accepted as Tridentea jucunda (N.E.Br.) L.C.Leach 
 Tridentea longii (C.A.Luckh.) L.C.Leach, accepted as Orbea longii (C.A.Luckh.) Bruyns, present
 Tridentea longipes (C.A.Luckh.) L.C.Leach, accepted as Tromotriche pedunculata (Masson) Bruyns subsp. longipes (C.A.Luckh.) Bruyns, present
 Tridentea marientalensis (Nel) L.C.Leach, indigenous
 Tridentea marientalensis (Nel) L.C.Leach subsp. marientalensis, indigenous
 Tridentea pachyrrhiza (Dinter) L.C.Leach, indigenous
 Tridentea parvipuncta (N.E.Br.) L.C.Leach, indigenous
 Tridentea parvipuncta (N.E.Br.) L.C.Leach subsp. parvipuncta, endemic
 Tridentea parvipuncta (N.E.Br.) L.C.Leach subsp. truncata (C.A.Luckh.) Bruyns, endemic
 Tridentea parvipuncta (N.E.Br.) L.C.Leach var. truncata (C.A.Luckh.) L.C.Leach, accepted as Tridentea parvipuncta (N.E.Br.) L.C.Leach subsp. truncata (C.A.Luckh.) Bruyns, present
 Tridentea peculiaris (C.A.Luckh.) L.C.Leach, endemic
 Tridentea pedunculata (Masson) L.C.Leach, accepted as Tromotriche pedunculata (Masson) Bruyns subsp. pedunculata, present
 Tridentea ruschiana (Dinter) L.C.Leach, accepted as Tromotriche ruschiana (Dinter) Bruyns 
 Tridentea umdausensis (Nel) L.C.Leach, accepted as Tromotriche umdausensis (Nel) Bruyns, present
 Tridentea virescens (N.E.Br.) L.C.Leach, indigenous

Tromotriche 
Genus Tromotriche:
 Tromotriche aperta (Masson) Bruyns, indigenous
 Tromotriche baylissii (L.C.Leach) Bruyns, endemic
 Tromotriche choanantha (Lavranos & H.Hall) Bruyns, endemic
 Tromotriche engleriana (Schltr.) L.C.Leach, accepted as Stapelia engleriana Schltr. present
 Tromotriche herrei (Nel) Bruyns, endemic
 Tromotriche longii (C.A.Luckh.) Bruyns, accepted as Orbea longii (C.A.Luckh.) Bruyns, endemic
 Tromotriche longipes (C.A.Luckh.) Bruyns, accepted as Tromotriche pedunculata (Masson) Bruyns subsp. longipes (C.A.Luckh.) Bruyns, indigenous
 Tromotriche pedunculata (Masson) Bruyns, indigenous
 Tromotriche pedunculata (Masson) Bruyns subsp. longipes (C.A.Luckh.) Bruyns, indigenous
 Tromotriche pedunculata (Masson) Bruyns subsp. pedunculata, indigenous
 Tromotriche revoluta (Masson) Haw. endemic
 Tromotriche thudichumii (Pillans) L.C.Leach, endemic
 Tromotriche umdausensis (Nel) Bruyns, indigenous

Tylophora 
Genus Tylophora, now included in Vincetoxicum:
 Tylophora anomala, syn. of Vincetoxicum anomalum (N.E.Br.) Meve & Liede, endemic
 Tylophora badia, syn. of Vincetoxicum badium (E.Mey.) Meve & Liede, indigenous
 Tylophora coddii, syn. of Vincetoxicum coddii (Bullock) Meve & Liede, endemic
 Tylophora cordata, syn. of Vincetoxicum cordatum (R.Br. ex Schult.) Meve & Liede, endemic
 Tylophora flanaganii, syn. of Vincetoxicum flanaganii (Schltr.) Meve & Liede, endemic
 Tylophora lycioides, syn. of Vincetoxicum lycioides (E.Mey.) Kuntze, indigenous
 Tylophora simiana, syn. of Vincetoxicum simianum  (Schltr.) Meve & Liede, endemic
 Tylophora umbellata, syn. of Vincetoxicum umbelliferum Meve & Liede, endemic

Vinca 
Genus Vinca:
 Vinca major L. not indigenous, naturalised, invasive
 Vinca minor L. not indigenous, naturalised, invasive

Voacanga 
Genus Voacanga:
 Voacanga thouarsii Roem. & Schult. indigenous

Woodia 
Genus Woodia:
 Woodia mucronata (Thunb.) N.E.Br. endemic
 Woodia mucronata (Thunb.) N.E.Br. var. mucronata,   accepted as Woodia mucronata (Thunb.) N.E.Br. present
 Woodia mucronata (Thunb.) N.E.Br. var. trifurcata (Schltr.) N.E.Br. accepted as Woodia mucronata (Thunb.) N.E.Br. present
 Woodia singularis N.E.Br. indigenous
 Woodia verruculosa Schltr. endemic

Wrightia 
Genus Wrightia:
 Wrightia natalensis Stapf, indigenous

Xysmalobium 
Genus Xysmalobium:
 Xysmalobium acerateoides (Schltr.) N.E.Br. indigenous
 Xysmalobium asperum N.E.Br. indigenous
 Xysmalobium baurii N.E.Br. endemic
 Xysmalobium brownianum S.Moore, indigenous
 Xysmalobium carinatum (Schltr.) N.E.Br. endemic
 Xysmalobium confusum Scott-Elliot, indigenous
 Xysmalobium fluviale Bruyns, endemic
 Xysmalobium gerrardii Scott-Elliot, endemic
 Xysmalobium gomphocarpoides (E.Mey.) D.Dietr. indigenous
 Xysmalobium gomphocarpoides (E.Mey.) D.Dietr. var. gomphocarpoides, endemic
 Xysmalobium gomphocarpoides (E.Mey.) D.Dietr. var. parvilobum Bruyns, endemic
 Xysmalobium involucratum (E.Mey.) Decne. indigenous
 Xysmalobium orbiculare (E.Mey.) D.Dietr. indigenous
 Xysmalobium parviflorum Harv. ex Scott-Elliot, indigenous
 Xysmalobium pearsonii L.Bolus, endemic
 Xysmalobium pedifoetidum Bester & Nicholas, indigenous
 Xysmalobium prunelloides Turcz. endemic
 Xysmalobium stockenstromense Scott-Elliot, indigenous
 Xysmalobium trauseldii R.A.Dyer, accepted as Xysmalobium woodii N.E.Br. present
 Xysmalobium tysonianum (Schltr.) N.E.Br. indigenous
 Xysmalobium undulatum (L.) Aiton f. indigenous
 Xysmalobium undulatum (L.) Aiton f. var. ensifolium Burch. ex Scott-Elliot, indigenous
 Xysmalobium undulatum (L.) Aiton f. var. undulatum, indigenous
 Xysmalobium winterbergense N.E.Br. endemic
 Xysmalobium woodii N.E.Br. indigenous
 Xysmalobium zeyheri N.E.Br. endemic

Hybrids 

 X Hoodiapelia beukmanii  (C.A.Luckh.) G.D.Rowley, endemic
 X Hoodiopsis triebneri  C.A.Luckh. indigenous

References

South African plant biodiversity lists
Apocynaceae